= Albert Nagymihályi =

Hungarian baron

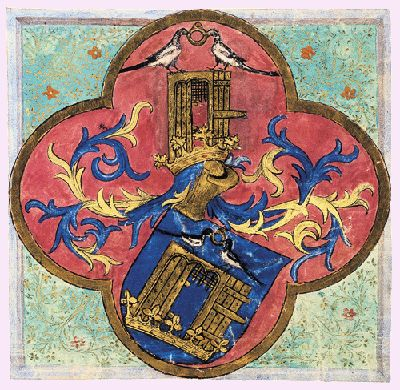
- Coat-of-arms of Albert Nagymihályi and his kinship, donated by King Sigismund in 1418

Ban of Croatia and Dalmatia
- Reign: 1419–1426
- Predecessor: Ivaniš Nelipić
- Successor: Nicholas Frankopan
- Died: 1433 or 1434
- Noble family: House of Nagymihályi
- Issue: John Bánfi; Ladislaus Bánfi; George Bánfi
- Father: Gregory Nagymihályi

Albert Nagymihályi (also Ungi or Vinnai, Hungarian: Nagymihályi Albert; died 1433 or 1434) was a Hungarian influential baron and knight of the Order of Saint John of Jerusalem in the first third of the 15th century. As a confidant of King Sigismund, he served as Prior of Vrana from 1417 until his death. Beside that, he was also Ban of Croatia and Dalmatia between 1419 and 1426.

== Ancestry ==
Albert was born into the Nagymihály branch of the gens (clan) Kaplon, an ancient Hungarian kindred, which, according to the tradition, took part in the Hungarian conquest of the Carpathian Basin in the late 9th century. Albert belonged to the so-called Gézsény sub-branch, which descended from Jakó (IV), the son of Andrew Kaplon (an influential lord in the second half of the 13th century). Albert's father was Gregory Nagymihályi, who died before 1380. Albert had two brothers, Ladislaus (III) and George.

There are only scattered sources about his early life. Albert Nagymihályi is first mentioned by contemporary records in 1380, when his father already died. His brother Ladislaus took part in the Horvats' rebellion against Sigismund and swore loyalty to the anti-king Ladislaus of Naples in the late 1380s. Therefore, Sigismund confiscated his portions in Nagymihály, Vinna, Gézsény, Sztára in Ung County, Tapolya and Petróc in Zemplén County (present-day Michalovce, Vinné, Hažín, Staré, Topoľany and Petrovce nad Laborcom in Slovakia, respectively) and donated to their relatives John Tibai (the second cousin of the late Gregory). Sometime after Tibai returned the estates to Nagymihályi, excluding Nagymihály. After Tibai was killed in the Battle of Nicopolis in September 1396, Sigismund donated the estate with its accessories to Nagymihályi for his unspecified "faithful services" in the next year, in May 1397. Sigismund confirmed Tibai's former donations regarding the other estates in favor of Nagymihályi in November 1397.

== Early career ==
Despite these donations, Nagymihályi, at the beginning of his career, was counted among the poorest family members. According to historian Pál Engel, he had approximately altogether 55–60 serfs in his estates in Ung and Zemplén counties. Nagymihályi owed his social rise to his military service. Under the banner of Nicholas Csáki and Nicholas Marcali, the ispáns of Temes County, Nagymihályi took part in the clashes with the Ottoman Turks along the southern frontier sometime after 1394. In this capacity, he fought in the crusade in the summer of 1396, which led to the disastrous Battle of Nicopolis in September in that year. He was certainly therefore able to get back the properties confiscated from his unfaithful brother with this military participation. In the subsequent decade, Nagymihályi participated in the royal campaign in the Kingdom of Bosnia against the supporters of Ladislaus of Naples.

Prior to 1409, he joined to the familia of Stibor of Stiboricz. Under his service, Nagymihályi was referred to as vice-ispán of Közép-Szolnok County in that year, in December 1409. He functioned as vice-ispán of Szolnok County and court bailiff for his lord Stibor in 1410. Despite his age, he was among the group of so-called "royal youth" (iuvenis noster) in 1410, which indicates his permanent place in the Hungarian royal court. Upon the intervention of Stibor, Nagymihályi was granted half of the estate Tarpa in Bereg County in that year. Under Stibor's banner, Nagymihályi participated in the Hungarian–Venetian war of 1411–1413, leading the voivode's banderium in Friuli and Istria, under the overall command of Pippo Spano. Their army recovered many castles and towns conquered by the Republic of Venice earlier. He fought at the walls of Sacile. Following the death of Stibor in 1414, Nagymihályi entered the service of the voivode's namesake nephew, who was Bishop of Eger at that time. He acted as the bishop's officialis in Szentmárton in 1415.

Similarly to other nobles, Nagymihályi was involved in various legal conflicts with his kinship (for instance, Peter Tibai or the Vajnatinais) over the years. These charters frequently call him with the "de Vynna" suffix, indicating that his permanent residence was Vinna at that time. Upon his request, Judge royal Simon Rozgonyi transcribed the former royal donations and confirmations regarding the estates Tiba and Sztára to the Nagymihály branch in 1414, in addition to the 1337 division contract between the family members. Palatine Nicholas Garai and the cathedral chapter of Eger also confirmed the former donations for Nagymihályi regarding Nagymihály, Tiba (Tibava), Perecse (present-day a borough of Michalovce) and Sztára in 1416. Other documents from the same period refers to Albert with the "dictum Vngy" suffix too, implying that his name was already known outside Ung County, where he was a leading member of the nobility and a prominent landowner by that time.

== Social rise ==
=== Prior of Vrana ===
Following the death of his unidentified wife, with whom he had three sons, Albert Nagymihályi joined the Knights Hospitaller. It is possible that he fought the campaigns against the Turks in this capacity. Beside that, he was knighted to the Order of the Dragon, founded by Sigismund in 1408. Albert Nagymihályi was a typical representative of the king's "new aristocracy", called "homo novus". At the beginning of his reign, Sigismund experienced many rebellions, so he sought to create a new elite loyal to him, who could only owe their social rise to him. As a member of Bishop Stibor's entourage, Nagymihályi attended the Council of Constance from 1415. The ecumenical council became the scene of Nagymihályi's rise to the Hungarian political and social elite. Sigismund appointed Albert Nagymihályi as the prior of Vrana (i.e. head of the Hungarian–Slavonian Priory of the Knights Hospitaller) on 16 October 1417 in Constance (Konstanz). In December 1417, Grand Master Philibert de Naillac confirmed Nagymihályi's appointment, who thus won the position as the candidate of the Hungarian king following the forced resignation of Michele Ferrandi, who did not enjoy Sigismund's trust. Hungarian historian Ede Reiszig incorrectly claimed that Nagymihályi held the position already in 1408. In February 1418, Nagymihályi's appointment was confirmed for life by Philibert de Naillac. He was mandated to recruit Hungarians to the Knights Hospitaller due to the decline in the number of knights in Hungary, and the amount of the priory's payment obligation to be paid by the order was set at 400 gold florins annually. Nagymihályi found the amount satisfactory, and the following year, in 1419, he paid the requested amount through the Medicis.

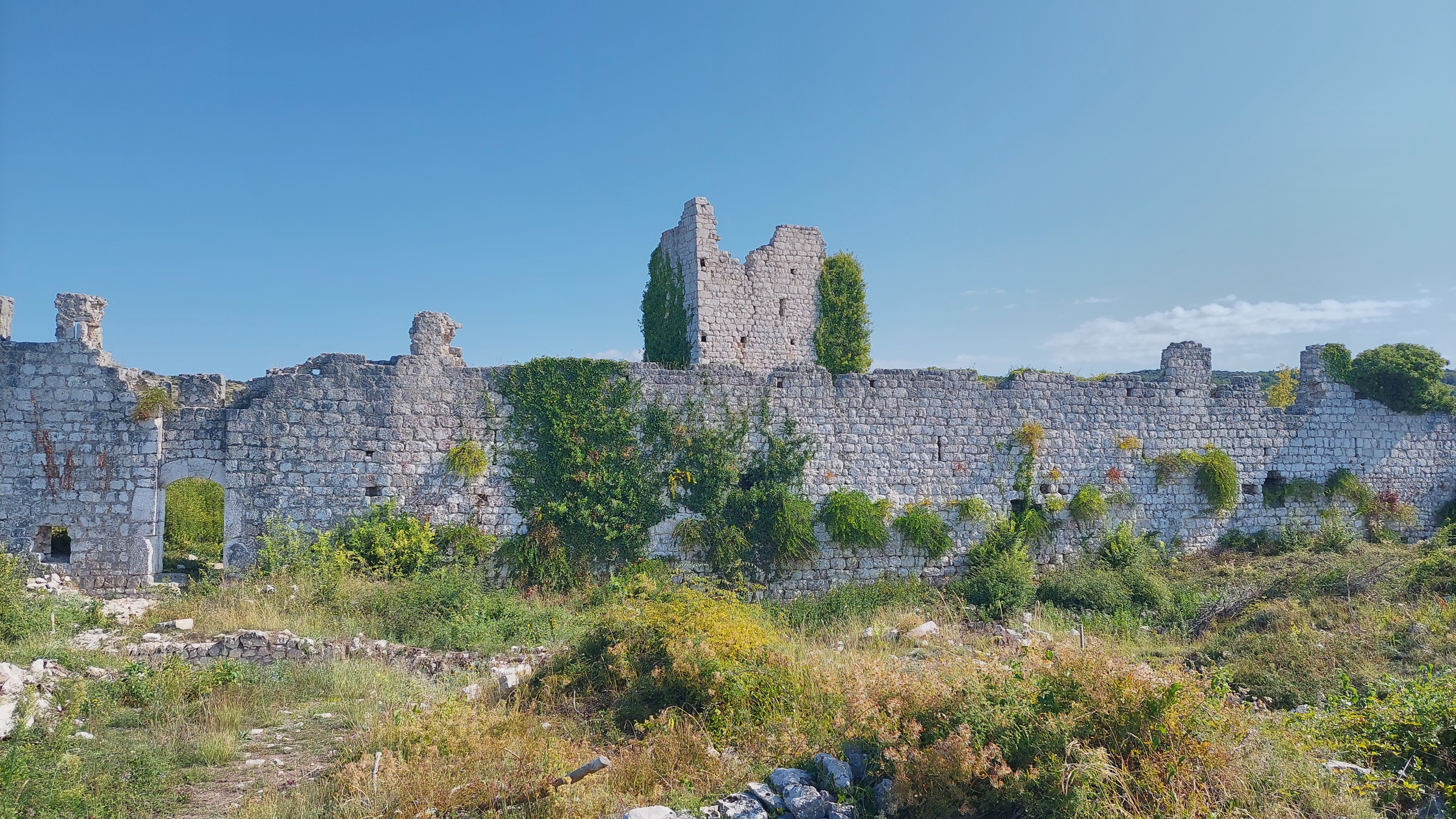
The ruins of Vrana in Croatia

Still in Constance, King Sigismund bestowed upon Albert Nagymihályi and his family the old coat-of-arms of their clan, adding a crown, and confirmed their use of it on 29 March 1418. The narration of the royal charter details his fights in the battles against the Turks and heretics in Temes County, and his services in Germany and Italy. Already residing in Regensburg, Sigismund confirmed and donated all previously owned estates – Nagymihály with its fort, Sztára, Krivostyán (today a borough of Strážske, Slovakia), Oroszka, Visk (today Vyshkovo, Ukraine), Perecse, Tapolya, Petróc, Györke (Ďurkov, Slovakia), Remete and Jeszenő (Vyšné Remety, Slovakia) and Tiba (Tibava, Slovakia) in Zemplén and Ung counties, in addition to Gelénes in Szatmár County, to Nagymihályi and his kinship as "new donations" in August 1418. This letter of donation granted ownership over a total of 69 estates. With this move, Nagymihályi, who also considered the situation of his relatives a matter of concern, successfully prevented the fragmentation of landholdings due to extensive kinship, and under the title of the new donation, he kept the extensive Nagymihályi estate for himself and his extended family. The castle of Nagymihály remained in the hands of the noble family undivided.

After 1419, however, there is no record that he paid any additional taxes to the central province of the Hospitaller Rhodes, nor did he participate in the Chapter General which was convened twice (1420, 1428) during his term. Thus, the relationship and communication between the Hungarian–Slavonian Priory and the Knights of Rhodes were very limited under the tenure of Nagymihályi. One of his main efforts was to reclaim his seat, Vrana, from Venice. The Knights Hospitaller submitted a petition to the Signoria to return the captured castle, but Venice rejected the petition in March 1420, stating that Vrana had been purchased from King Ladislaus of Naples. As prior, thus, Nagymihályi usually resided in Pakrac; he issued three of his six surviving charters there, two in 1421 and a single in 1424. He also published one document each in Fadd (1419), Székesfehérvár (1423) and Knin (1425). Nagymihályi granted privileges to the estate Fadd, which belonged to the Székesfehérvár Convent. He also appointed officials in several settlements, possessed by the Knights Hospitaller, located in Tolna County. Thomas Kölkedi, the future preceptor of the Székesfehérvár Convent acted as Nagymihályi's lawyer in the 1420s. Under Nagymihályi, the Priory of Vrana maintained a cooperative relationship with the convent concerned the estates in Tolna County and along the Danube.

Albert Nagymihályi died in the second half of 1433 or early 1434. Although, Grand Master Anton Flavian de Ripa appointed Johannes Cavalion as Prior of Vrana for a period of ten years in August 1433, referring to the death of his predecessor, this was probably based on misinformation because, anticipating the news of the death of Nagymihályi, who was probably already seriously ill by that time. After his death, King Sigismund – neglecting the appointment of Cavalion – appointed Matko Talovac as governor of priory, who used its assets for the war against the Ottoman Empire.

=== Ban of Croatia and Dalmatia ===
Sometime between April and June 1419, Nagymihályi was appointed Ban of Dalmatia and Croatia by Sigismund, while he also retained his office of prior. He was one of the few common nobles who rose to the highest positions during Sigismund's reign, becoming a member of the aristocracy within a generation. As a ban, a key military function, his main task was to protect that parts in Dalmatia that remained under Hungarian rule against the aspirations of the Republic of Venice.

In the early 1420s, he and his relatives were involved in various lawsuits against the Csapi family over the inheritance of Peter Tibai, who died in 1419. Palatine Nicholas Garai ruled in favor of Nagymihályi in 1424, granting him the estates Tiba, Csertész, Váralja, Felsőremete and Konyus (today Tibava, Čertižné, Podhoroď, Vyšné Remety and Koňuš in Slovakia, respectively). He was also involved in a lengthy lawsuit against his relatives, mainly Joshua Tibai. Prior to 1425, as a result, he acquired the lordship of Vajnatina (today Vojnatina, Slovakia), in addition to Németporuba (Poruba pod Vihorlatom) and other portions in Felsőremete. This meant a total of eight estates, with 248 inhabited and 80 uninhabited serf plots.

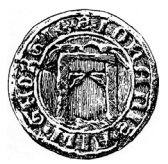
The seal of Albert Nagymihályi (1424)

Nagymihályi often stayed away from the province. He fought in the Hussite Wars in Upper Hungary and Bohemia in the years 1420–1422. He was also involved in the war of succession in Wallachia. He fielded 225 spearmen at his own expense, at whose head he fought to assist the Hungarian vassal Dan II, whom his rival Radu II, who received military support from the Ottoman Empire, deprived of his throne. Dan II successfully regained his throne in the spring of 1426.

The end of his banate, which took place in the early months of 1426, was brought about by Sigismund's financial crisis and the accompanying political machinations. Already in 1424, the king entrusted Nicholas Frankopan (Palatine Garai's brother-in-law) to obtain 20,000 gold ducats from Venice. In exchange for the amount, Sigismund promised him to appoint Frankopan as Ban of Croatia, which Nagymihályi was of course unaware of. Frankopan had extensive business relations with the republic, so negotiations began between the two parties regarding a financial loan offered in return for collateral (his estates in Dalmatia). In his absence, Nagymihályi, who was still fighting in Wallachia (see above), was replaced from his position. For his military merits, and perhaps as compensation for the loss of his dignity of ban, Nagymihályi and his three sons were granted the inheritance of the extinct Jánki family by Sigismund in May 1427. The donation contained all estates of the Jánkis in Csanád, Krassó and Temes counties, including the lordship of Nagylak (also including, for instance, Mezőhegyes and Palota), the castle of Szentgyörgy (today Sângeorge, Romania) and dozens of villages. In the following month, Nagymihályi reached agreements with those lords, namely ispán George Csáki and Rupert Tari, who had liens on some of Jánki's estates due to previous loans. Thereafter, in July 1427, Nagymihályi was officially installed as the owner of the lands, with a few exceptions, granted to him.

== Personal life ==
Albert Nagymihályi had three sons – John, Ladislaus and George – from his marriage with an unidentified noblewoman. After his death, they adopted the surname "Bánfi" and "Priorfi" (lit. "son of ban" and "son of prior", respectively) de Nagymihály, using both simultaneously and forming a sub-branch within the Nagymihályi family.

The eldest son John served as provost of Požega in 1432, when he and George were granted indulgence from Lucius de Janua, procurator of the grand master. Ladislaus was involved in conflicts with his relatives over the boundaries of his estate Tiba in 1436. The three brothers took part in the process of division of the Nagymihályi estates with their relatives in late 1437. However, the conflicts and lawsuits did not end there. George borrowed a significant amount of money to Ladislaus (V), the last member of the Nagymihályis' senior branch in 1448, in return, he mortgaged several estates from him. When this Ladislaus died in 1449, as a consequence of the aforementioned 1418 donation letter, the previously acquired estates could remain in the hands of the other branches of the family, including Albert's sons, and the estates did not escheated to the crown.

Among the sons of Albert, only George had descendants. He married Anne Semsei, with whom he had two children, Stephen (fl. 1449) and Hedwig (fl. 1445–1449). Albert's three sons played no role in national politics, most of their lives were spent defending their estates and rights against their neighbors (relatives). John was still alive in 1465, while Ladislaus and George are last mentioned in contemporary records in 1454.

== Sources ==
- Engel, Pál (1996). Magyarország világi archontológiája, 1301–1457, I. [Secular Archontology of Hungary, 1301–1457, Volume I] (in Hungarian). História, MTA Történettudományi Intézete. ISBN 963-8312-44-0.
- Engel, Pál (1998). A nemesi társadalom a középkori Ung megyében [The Noble Society in Medieval Ung County] (in Hungarian). Társadalom- és művelődéstörténeti tanulmányok 25., MTA Történettudományi Intézete. ISBN 963-8312-59-9.
- Fügedi, Erik (1974). Uram, királyom... (in Hungarian). Gondolat. ISBN 963-280-077-X.
- Hunyadi, Zsolt; Ribi, András (2023). The Knights Hospitaller in Medieval Hungary. Arpadiana XIII., Research Centre for the Humanities. ISBN 978-963-416-388-6.
- Mályusz, Elemér (1984). Zsigmond király uralma Magyarországon, 1387–1437 [The Rule of King Sigismund in Hungary, 1387–1437] (in Hungarian). Gondolat. ISBN 963-281-414-2.
- Markó, László (2006). A magyar állam főméltóságai Szent Istvántól napjainkig: Életrajzi Lexikon [Great Officers of State in Hungary from King Saint Stephen to Our Days: A Biographical Encyclopedia] (in Hungarian). Helikon Kiadó. ISBN 963-208-970-7.
- Nagy, Gyula, ed. (1889). A nagymihályi és sztárai gróf Sztáray család oklevéltára. Második kötet 1397–1457 [The Diploma Archive of the Count Sztáray de Nagymihály et Sztára Family. Volume Two: 1397–1457] (in Hungarian). Count Antal Sztáray.

Albert House of Nagymihályi Born: ? Died: 1433 or 1434
Catholic Church titles
Preceded by Michele Ferrandi	Prior of Vrana; 1417–1433	Succeeded by Matko Talovac
Political offices
Preceded by Ivaniš Nelipić	Ban of Croatia and Dalmatia; 1419–1426	Succeeded by Nicholas Frankopan
