= John Tibai =

Hungarian nobleman

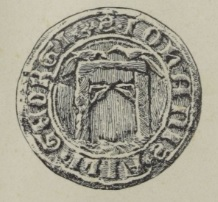
- Seal of John Tibai, 1370

Ispán of Ung
- Reign: 1387–1396
- Predecessor: Ladislaus Drugeth
- Successor: Ladislaus Drugeth
- Died: 25 September 1396; Battle of Nicopolis
- Noble family: House of Tibai
- Spouse: Apollonia N
- Father: George Tibai
- Mother: Margaret Csapi

John Tibai (also Nagymihályi, Hungarian: Tibai János; died 25 September 1396) was a Hungarian nobleman and knight in the 14th century, who served as ispán of Ung County from 1387 until his death. His military services allowed him to rise in society, becoming the most illustrious member of his family.

== Family ==
John was born into the Tibai noble family, which originated from the Nagymihály branch of the gens (clan) Kaplon. He was the eldest son of George Tibai, the vice-ispán of Ung County from 1362 to 1370, and Margaret Csapi. John had three brothers (Peter, Jakó, Ladislaus) and three sisters (Catherine, Clara, Anne). John married Apollonia from an unidentified family. They had no children.

== Career ==
The name of John first appears in contemporary records in 1347, when possessed portions in Reviscse (today Blatné Revištia, Slovakia), and was involved in a lawsuit with some members of his wider kinship. In the subsequent decades, his father George had many legal conflicts with his cousin, John (II) Nagymihályi (also Gézsényi), the son of Jakó (IV). Along with his siblings, John is sometimes mentioned during this processes, for instance, in 1362 and 1364 (when he possessed a portion in Perecse). John participated in the Bulgarian campaign of King Louis I of Hungary in 1368. Upon his request, the monarch forbade his relative James (II), who also stayed in the royal camp, to sell his portion in Gelénes in Szatmár County.

George Tibai died sometime between January and March 1370. He was succeeded as vice-ispán of Ung County by his son John immediately. He also inherited his father's seal. John is mentioned in this capacity throughout from 1370 to 1377. He judged over the lawsuit between Paul Csicseri and the provostry of Lelesz (Leles, Slovakia), when he first appears as vice-ispán in March 1370. Similarly to his father, John was a familiaris of the Lackfi family. Together with his uncle Ladislaus, he acquired the estate Koromlya (Koromľa, Slovakia) in 1370. He took part in the assembly of Ung County in August 1370, summoned by Palatine Vladislaus II of Opole. John's seal is preserved by the latter's charter: it depicts an open gate with decorative carving, and on it two magpies with characteristic long tails. Throughout the 1370s, John Tibai was involved in a lawsuit with the Leszteméri family. Upon his request, King Louis I confirmed the family's right of ownership over the estates Sztára (today Staré) and Perecse (today a borough of Michalovce, Slovakia) in 1371, transcribing the 1273 royal charter of Ladislaus IV. Alongside his siblings, John protested against the prefection of their cousin Magdalene, the daughter of Nicholas Lucskai in 1372 and 1373, refusing to secure her inheritance.

John, plausibly due to the intervention of the Lackfis, entered the service of Queen Elizabeth of Bosnia by 1379, when escorted her to Prague in order to confirm the marriage proposal of Mary and Sigismund. John borrowed 12 golden florins for the diplomatic mission. John was a strong supporter of queens Elizabeth and Mary after 1382. As a familiaris of George Jakcs, he served as castellan of the queenly castle of Munkács (present-day Mukachevo, Ukraine) in 1387. Following the political crisis, he swore loyalty to Sigismund. John was installed as ispán of Ung County in 1387, holding the office until his death. His deputy was Michael Vajkóci during the entire period. He was referred to as knight of the queen's court from 1389 to 1395, until Mary's death. He took part in the fights against the rebellious Horvat family and John of Palisna in Slavonia in the spring of 1389. Thereafter, he participated in a military campaign against Moravian Serbia. He was present at the siege of Borač Fortress. For his service, he was granted Kovászó and Vári in Bereg County (present-day Kvasovo and Vary in Ukraine, respectively) jointly by Sigismund and Mary in 1390. Around the same time, he also acquired Jenke and Bethlen (today Jenkovce in Slovakia and Beclean in Romania, respectively), but local landowners objected the royal donation referring to their privileges. Meanwhile, John had a long-lasting conflict with his uncle Nicholas Lucskai over the port duties at Lucska (today Lúčky, Slovakia). John acquired significant portions in Lucska and the surrounding lands (altogether 21 estates) as a royal donation around the same period. Sigismund also donated him the landholdings of Nicholas Szeretvai – portions in Pályin, Pinkóc and Szeretva (present-day Palín, Pinkovce and Stretava in Slovakia, respectively) – who was declared disloyal. Later, he exchanged these estates for Gejőc (Mali Hejivci, Ukraine) with his brother-in-law Peter Ramocsa de Szeretva in 1394. John was granted the portions – in Nagymihály, Vinna, Gézsény, Sztára in Ung County, Topolyán and Petróc in Zemplén County (present-day Michalovce, Vinné, Hažín, Staré, Topoľany and Petrovce nad Laborcom in Slovakia, respectively) – of Ladislaus Nagymihályi (from the Gézsény sub-branch), who betrayed Sigismund took part in the Horvats' rebellion. John, excluding in Nagymihály, returned the estates to Albert, Ladislaus' brother.

King Sigismund sent John Tibai to the Kingdom of Bosnia as his envoy at the end of 1392 in order to negotiate with King Dabiša of Bosnia, who was willing to leave the allegiance of Ladislaus of Naples, Sigismund's rival as pretender to the Hungarian throne. For his diplomatic service, John was granted the estates Bereg and Almás in Bereg County (today Velyki Berehy and Zaluzzsja in Ukraine, respectively) together with the local Vlach and Ruthenian serfs by Queen Mary in the spring of 1393. He also served as ispán of Bereg County and castellan of Munkács in that year. John Tibai took part in Sigismund's campaign against Moldavia in the second half of 1394. He was part of the Crusader army which marched to the Ottoman Empire in 1396. John was killed in the disastrous Battle of Nicopolis on 25 September 1396, together with his relative, Stephen (II) Nagymihályi. Leaving no male heirs, his wealth was mostly inherited by his only surviving brother, the cleric Peter, but many royal donations did also escheat to the Crown.

== Sources ==
- Engel, Pál (1996). Magyarország világi archontológiája, 1301–1457, I. [Secular Archontology of Hungary, 1301–1457, Volume I] (in Hungarian). História, MTA Történettudományi Intézete. ISBN 963-8312-44-0.
- Engel, Pál (1998a). A nemesi társadalom a középkori Ung megyében [The Noble Society in Medieval Ung County] (in Hungarian). Társadalom- és művelődéstörténeti tanulmányok 25., MTA Történettudományi Intézete. ISBN 963-8312-59-9.
- Engel, Pál (1998b). "A török–magyar háborúk első évei 1389–1392 [The First Years of the Hungarian–Ottoman Wars 1389–1392]". Hadtörténelmi Közlemények (in Hungarian). 111 (3). Hadtörténeti Intézet és Múzeum: 12–28. ISSN 0017-6540.
- Krantzieritz, Károly (2015). "A nikápolyi csata magyar résztvevői [Hungarian participants of the Battle of Nicopolis]". Hadtörténelmi Közlemények (in Hungarian). 128 (1). Hadtörténeti Intézet és Múzeum: 162–183. ISSN 0017-6540.
- Nagy, Gyula, ed. (1887). A nagymihályi és sztárai gróf Sztáray család oklevéltára. Első kötet 1234–1396 [The Diploma Archive of the Count Sztáray de Nagymihály et Sztára Family. Volume One: 1234–1396] (in Hungarian). Count Antal Sztáray.

John I House of Tibai Born: ? Died: 25 September 1396
Political offices
Preceded by Ladislaus Drugeth	Ispán of Ung; 1387–1396	Succeeded by Ladislaus Drugeth
Preceded by Stephen Losonci	Ispán of Bereg; 1393	Succeeded by Theodor Koriatovits & Vasily Koriatovits
