= Tibai family =

Hungarian noble family

House of Tibai
- Hungarian noble family
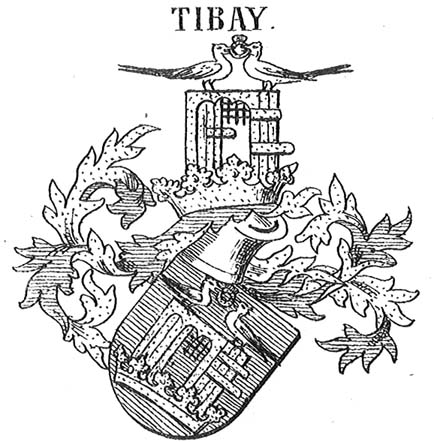
- Coat-of-arms (Siebmachers Wappenbuch, 1893)
- Parent house: Genus Kaplon
- Country: Hungary; Hungary
- Founded: 1335
- Founder: Lawrence I
- Final ruler: Ladislaus VIII
- Dissolution: c. 1637
- Cadet branches: House of Sztáray

The Tibai or Tibay (initially also known as Vajnatinai or Ördög) family was a noble family in the Kingdom of Hungary, which possessed lands mostly in Ung and Szatmár counties. The family originated from the Nagymihály branch of the ancient Hungarian gens (clan) Kaplon. The illustrious Sztáray family is a cadet branch of the Tibais.

== History ==
=== Origin ===
According to the tradition, the prestigious Kaplon clan took part in the Hungarian conquest of the Carpathian Basin in the late 9th century. Subsequently, they settled in the Nyírség region, primarily Szatmár County. The Kaplons spread into several branches in the following centuries, which possessed estates in the neighboring counties too in Northeastern Hungary. One of them, the Nagymihály branch acquired extensive landholdings in Ung and Zemplén counties in the 13th century. By the extinction of the Árpád dynasty, the brothers Andrew and Jakó Kaplon possessed Nagymihály lordship, which consisted of several estates, for instance Sztára (today Staré) and Jeszenő (today Jasenov, Slovakia), with their centre Nagymihály (present-day Michalovce, Slovakia). They also purchased the land Tiba (today Tibava, Slovakia) in Ung County in 1290, where they erected a small castle ("Tibavára", today ruins near Podhoroď, Slovakia) around 1300.

=== Formation ===
The branch proved to be quite numerous in the 14th century, which led to the fragmentation of the unified Nagymihály property: Andrew and Jakó had altogether five sons, ten grandsons and fourteen great-grandsons who also begot offspring. Lawrence (I), the first member of the Tibai family was the eldest son of Andrew. Other noble families (e.g. Nagymihályis and Pongráczs) descended from his brothers and cousins. Lawrence is first mentioned by sources in 1307, when, along with his uncle Jakó, exchanged Barkó Castle (today Brekov, Slovakia) for unspecified lands, Zubugya and Hozdó in Zemplén County with the influential lord Peter, son of Petenye. His whole life was characterized by legal conflicts and disputes with his relatives over the possession rights of the inherited estates. Charles I of Hungary confirmed the kinship as owner of Sztára and Perecse (today a borough of Michalovce, Slovakia) in 1328 and Gelénes in Szatmár County in 1330. Lawrence sued his nephews, the Meggyesi family in 1331, because they refused to pay the dower to his sister Catherine, the second wife of the late Nicholas Pok. He also sued his cousins (the sons of Jakó), who refused to pay the inheritance to his other sister Elizabeth in 1335.

To avoid further conflicts, the cousins agreed to divide the fortune of Nagymihály lordship in 1335 and 1336. The estates of Tiba, Jeszenő and Ricse along with the villages surrounding Nagymihály were divided into portions among the family members. Thereafter, Lawrence and his sons mainly resided in Tiba in Ung County, adopting their family name after the settlement. Despite the land division, relationship remained tense between members of the branch, for instance, over the estate Gelénes. Lawrence had four sons: George I, Peter I, Ladislaus I and Nicholas I. All of them were adults by the early 1330s. The Tibai (initially, also known as Ördög or Vajnatinai) family descended from Ladislaus, while Nicholas was ancestor of the Lucskai family.

=== Senior branch ===
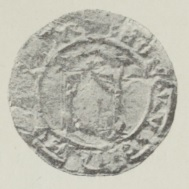
Seal of George Tibai (1370)

However, the most influential members were George and his sons. George entered the service of the powerful Lackfi family. As their familiaris, George served as vice-ispán of Ung County under ispáns Paul I and Nicholas I Lackfi from 1362 to 1370. He was succeeded as vice-ispán by his eldest son John I, who also inherited his seal. John fought in various military campaigns, for instance, in the Bulgarian war of King Louis I of Hungary in 1368. Throughout his whole life, George was involved in various lawsuits and disputes against his relatives and neighbors, over the boundaries of the divided estates.

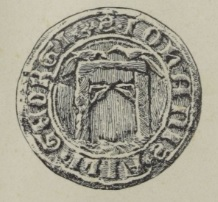
Seal of John Tibai (1370)

John is mentioned as vice-ispán throughout from 1370 to 1377. His seal depicts an open gate with decorative carving, and on it two magpies with characteristic long tails. Upon his request, King Louis I confirmed the family's right of ownership over the estates Sztára and Perecse in 1371, transcribing the 1273 royal charter of Ladislaus IV. John, plausibly due to the intervention of the Lackfis, entered the service of Queen Elizabeth of Bosnia by 1379, when escorted her to Prague in order to confirm the marriage proposal of Mary and Sigismund. John was a strong supporter of queens Elizabeth and Mary after 1382. As a familiaris of George Jakcs, he served as castellan of the queenly castle of Munkács (present-day Mukachevo, Ukraine) in 1387. He was installed as ispán of Ung County in 1387, holding the office until his death. He fought in Slavonia and Moravian Serbia against those rebels (i.e. the Horvat family), who contested Sigismund's rule. For his service, he was granted several landholdings throughout the years, including Kovászó and Vári in Bereg County (present-day Kvasovo and Vary in Ukraine, respectively). He also acquired significant portions at Lucska (today Lúčky, Slovakia), resulting a long-standing conflict with his uncle Nicholas and his kinship. John took part in Sigismund's campaign against Moldavia in the second half of 1394. He was part of the Crusader army which marched to the Ottoman Empire in 1396. John was killed in the disastrous Battle of Nicopolis on 25 September 1396. Leaving no male heirs, his wealth was mostly inherited by his only surviving brother, the cleric Peter, but many royal donations did also escheat to the Crown.

Prior to 1387, Peter became parish priest of the royal free city of Nagybánya (also known as Asszonypataka or Rivulus Dominarum during that time). In that year, he concluded an agreement with the city magistrate that the parish priest is obliged to maintain a preacher and 11 chaplains. Ecclesiastical art and architecture flourished in Nagybánya during his time. Peter remained the only male member of the Tibais' senior branch after 1396, thus he inherited large amount of wealth. According to a census from 1398, he had 202 serfs and his lands can be estimated at 14 thousand hectares only in Ung County. According to Pál Engel, Peter was the fourth richest landowner in the county in 1398, after the Drugeths, Pálócis and his relatives, the Nagymihályis. Despite the objection of the latter, Peter pledged his various estates to his brothers-in-law throughout from 1404 to 1411. These lands were forever lost to the Tibai family (or the Nagymihály branch). Peter took part in a royal campaign against the Kingdom of Poland in 1411. He participated in the Council of Constance from 1414 to 1415, as a member of the Hungarian delegation. Peter died shortly before November 1419, with him, the brightest period of the Tibai family came to an end.

=== Vajnatina branch ===
Ladislaus I lived in Vajnatina (today Vojnatina, Slovakia), thus the Tibai family was often called "Vajnatinai" in the 14th century. From Ladislaus' epithet name ("Ördög", lit. "the Devil"), they were also referred to as Ördög family. Compared to his brother George and his family (see above), Ladislaus and his sons had much less wealth. They possessed Vajnatina and the surrounding villages, Ördögporubka (present-day Porúbka, Slovakia; whose modern Hungarian name still preserves the epithet of Ladislaus), Prekopa and Orehva (present-day Priekopa and Orechová in Slovakia, respectively), where they settled Ruthenian serfs in the early 15th century. The lordship had 68 serfs in 1398. Ladislaus was among those family members of the Nagymihály branch, who still possessed a portion in Tiba in 1379, which was confirmed by King Louis I in that year.

The Vajnatinais, later Tibais, did not go beyond the circle of insignificant noble families in Ung County for the upcoming centuries. The family is mentioned almost exclusively during litigation, in which other families of the former Nagymihály branch were most often involved, in addition to other neighboring lords. Their cadet branch, later became known as Sztáray family, elevated into the aristocracy in the 18th century, granting the title of baron then count. They descended from Andrew V, a great-grandson of Ladislaus I, who lived in the mid-15th century.

Following the Battle of Mohács, the Tibais (or Tibays) remained landowners in Ung County. One of its members, Michael III was literate, who functioned as notary of Zemplén County in 1559. His son was Christopher, who was granted a portion in Buzló in Sáros County in 1560. In the second half of the 16th century, the different branches died out one after the other. George IV, mentioned in 1559, had no descendants. His portions in Tiba were inherited by the offspring of his sisters, who divided the heritage in 1602. John V is mentioned as a living person in 1607. His son, Ladislaus VII was the representative of Ung County in the 1637 Diet of Hungary. The last member of the family was Ladislaus VIII in the mid-17th century, who had six daughters from two marriages, but no sons.

== Family tree ==
- Lawrence I (fl. 1307–1350, d. before 1353) ∞ daughter of magister Kakas (fl. 1353)
  - George I (fl. 1335–1370†) ∞ Margaret Csapi (fl. 1399–1404)
    - John I (fl. 1347–1396†) ∞ Apollonia N
    - Peter II (fl. 1372–1419†)
    - Jakó (fl. 1372–1373, d. before 1398)
    - Ladislaus II (fl. 1372–1396, d. before 1398)
    - Catherine (fl. 1345–1362) ∞ Nicholas Csapi
    - Clara (fl. 1400–1415) ∞ Stephen Butkai
    - Anne (fl. 1400–1415) ∞ Peter Ramocsa de Szeretva
  - Peter I (fl. 1335)
  - Ladislaus I ("the Devil"; fl. 1335–1391) ∞ Helena N (fl. 1349–1362), then Anne Palágyi (fl. 1389–1391)
    - Nicholas II (fl. 1369–1386)
      - Joshua (fl. 1404–1441) ∞ Afra N (fl. 1435)
        - Ladislaus IV (fl. 1416–1424)
        - Pelbartus (fl. 1421–1429)
    - Ladislaus III (fl. 1373–1386)
      - Stephen I (fl. 1404–1452)
        - George III (fl. 1424–1449)
        - Peter III (fl. 1424–1457)
        - Paul (fl. 1424–1434)
        - Lucas (fl. 1424–1449)
        - Ladislaus V (fl. 1434–1449)
      - John III ("Pap"; fl. 1404–1434, d. before 1441)
        - Nicholas IV
          - Andrew VI
            - Gregory
              - Francis I (fl. 1559)
        - Andrew V
          - Sztáray (Sztárai) family
        - Benedict I (fl. 1434–1457)
          - Martin
            - Benedict II (fl. 1559)
            - Ladislaus VI (fl. 1559)
      - George II (fl. 1404–1452)
        - Ambrose (fl. 1424–1461) ∞ Agatha Semsei
          - John IV
            - Blaise II (fl. 1559)
              - John V (fl. 1607)
                - Ladislaus VII (fl. 1637)
            - Michael III (fl. 1559)
              - Christopher (fl. 1560) ∞ Elizabeth Thegzes
              - Francis II (fl. 1560) ∞ Catherine Bekényi
              - Caspar (fl. 1559)
              - John VI (fl. 1559)
                - Ladislaus VIII ∞ Susanna Ujfalussy, then Sophia Pongrácz de Nagymihály
                  - (1) Veronica ∞ John Bajori
                  - (1) Ursula ∞ N Csicseri
                  - (1) Helena ∞ Ambrose Csicseri
                  - (1) Margaret ∞ N Both de Bajna
                  - (1) Dorothea ∞ James Fekete de Nagymihály
                  - (2) Anne ∞ Gabriel Dessewffy, then John Illosvay
                - Sophia (fl. 1558) ∞ Lawrence Attai de Azar
              - Denis (fl. 1559)
    - John II (fl. 1379–1419)
      - Nicholas V (fl. 1424–1429)
        - Andrew III (fl. 1434–1457)
      - Oswald (fl. 1424–1429)
      - Andrew II (fl. 1424–1434)
        - Andrew IV (fl. 1449–1454)
    - Andrew I (fl. 1379–1386)
    - Lawrence II (fl. 1379–1400)
      - Nicholas III (fl. 1404–1449) ∞ Helena Leszteméri
        - Albert (fl. 1434–1457)
          - Leonard ∞ Catherine Sós de Sóvár
            - Clara (fl. 1556) ∞ Stephen Ramocsai (d. before 1556)
            - Ursula ∞ Peter Glóbis, then Ladislaus Széchy (fl. 1545), then Paul Szendi
          - Lazarus
            - George IV (fl. 1559)
            - Agnes ∞ Francis Illosvay, then Demetrius Vay
        - Simon (fl. 1434–1449)
        - Blaise I (fl. 1434)
        - Nicholas VI (fl. 1449)
        - Stephen II (fl. 1449)
        - Michael II (fl. 1449)
    - Michael I (fl. 1379–1434)
      - Anne ∞ Stephen Pető
      - Dorothea (fl. 1437) ∞ Peter Agóci
    - Elizabeth ∞ Paul Ormos de Csicser
  - Nicholas I (fl. 1335–1412) ∞ Anych N (fl. 1379)
    - Lucskai family

== Sources ==
- Engel, Pál (1996). Magyarország világi archontológiája, 1301–1457, I. [Secular Archontology of Hungary, 1301–1457, Volume I] (in Hungarian). História, MTA Történettudományi Intézete. ISBN 963-8312-44-0.
- Engel, Pál (1998). A nemesi társadalom a középkori Ung megyében [The Noble Society in Medieval Ung County] (in Hungarian). Társadalom- és művelődéstörténeti tanulmányok 25., MTA Történettudományi Intézete. ISBN 963-8312-59-9.
- Karácsonyi, János (1901). A magyar nemzetségek a XIV. század közepéig. II. kötet [The Hungarian genera until the middle of the 14th century, Vol. 2] (in Hungarian). Hungarian Academy of Sciences.
- Nagy, Gyula, ed. (1887). A nagymihályi és sztárai gróf Sztáray család oklevéltára. Első kötet 1234–1396 [The Diploma Archive of the Count Sztáray de Nagymihály et Sztára Family. Volume One: 1234–1396] (in Hungarian). Count Antal Sztáray.
- Nagy, Gyula, ed. (1889). A nagymihályi és sztárai gróf Sztáray család oklevéltára. Második kötet 1397–1457 [The Diploma Archive of the Count Sztáray de Nagymihály et Sztára Family. Volume Two: 1397–1457] (in Hungarian). Count Antal Sztáray.
