= Peter Tibai =

Hungarian clergyman

- Parish priest of Nagybánya
- Installed: 1387 or before
- Term ended: 1419
- Predecessor: ?
- Successor: Peter Csapi

Personal details
- Died: February/November 1419
- Denomination: Roman Catholic
- Parents: George Tibai; Margaret Csapi

Peter Tibai (also Nagymihályi, Hungarian: Tibai Péter; died February/November 1419) was a Hungarian clergyman at the turn of the 14th and 15th centuries, who functioned as parish priest of the royal free city of Nagybánya (also known as Asszonypataka, present-day Baia Mare, Romania) at least from 1387 until his death. As a confidant of King Sigismund, he participated in the Council of Constance.

== Family ==
Peter was born into the Tibai noble family, which originated from the Nagymihály branch of the gens (clan) Kaplon. He was one of the four sons of George Tibai, the vice-ispán of Ung County from 1362 to 1370, and Margaret Csapi. Peter had three brothers (John, Jakó, Ladislaus) and three sisters (Catherine, Clara, Anne).

== Career ==
As the second son, Peter entered ecclesiastical service. His name is first mentioned in 1372 and 1373, when, alongside his brothers, protested against the prefection of their cousin Magdalene, the daughter of Nicholas Lucskai, refusing to secure her inheritance. He is mentioned with the adjective "litteratus", reflecting his literacy. At a young age, Peter functioned as parish priest of Gelénes in Szatmár County, an ancient estate of the Kaplon clan, which remained a jointly managed possession still in the second half of the 14th century. In the upcoming years, Peter was involved in various lawsuits against the other branches of the Kaplon clan over property rights, until their mutual agreement in 1379.

Prior to 1387, Peter Tibai became parish priest of the royal free city of Nagybánya (also known as Asszonypataka or Rivulus Dominarum during that time). In that year, he concluded an agreement with the city magistrate that the parish priest is obliged to maintain a preacher and 11 chaplains. The document was recorded in front of the Virgin Mary altar in the Saint Stephen's church (this is the first mention of the church of which only the bell tower has survived. Some relief fragments have also survived, which once decorated the walls of the Saint Stephen's church depicting Christ on the Mount of Olives and Arrest of Christ scenes. According to art historian Veronika Csikós, these reliefs, which are similar in style to the sculptural ensemble of the Petersportal of Cologne Cathedral, were ordered and financed by Peter in the late 14th century or early 15th century.

John Tibai was killed in the Battle of Nicopolis in 1396, leaving no male heir. Consequently, all three of his brothers predeceased Peter without descendants, thus Peter inherited a large fortune from his close family. According to a census from 1398, he had 202 serfs and his lands can be estimated at 14 thousand hectares in Ung County. He possessed eight villages, Tiba, Porosztó, Csertész, Váralja, Ubrezs, Németporuba, Felsőremete and Konyus, the latter was established by German colonists invited by Peter around 1414 (today Tibava, Porostov, Čertižné, Podhoroď, Úbrež, Poruba pod Vihorlatom, Vyšné Remety and Koňuš in Slovakia, respectively). According to Pál Engel, Peter was the fourth richest landowner in Ung County in 1398, after the Drugeths, Pálócis and his relatives, the Nagymihályis. He was involved in numerous lawsuits against the latter, for instance in 1397, when the boundaries marked by the course of certain streams called Tiboka, Benetina, Konyus and Gadna were disputed. He also inherited lawsuits from his late brother John. Peter pledged his largest estate Ubrezs for 4,000 golden florins to his brothers-in-law, Peter Ramocsa de Szeretva and Stephen Butkai (husbands of Anne and Clara, respectively) in 1404, despite the objection of the Nagymihályi kinship, which never managed to regain the possession. In addition to these landholdings, Peter also possessed portions in the ancient estates Nagymihály and Lucska (today Michalovce and Lúčky in Slovakia, respectively), in addition to houses in the capital Buda. Peter donated all of his possessions to his nephews, the sons of his sister Catherine and Nicholas Csapi in July 1411.

Peter was a confidant of King Sigismund. He took part in a royal campaign against the Kingdom of Poland in 1411. He participated in the Council of Constance from 1414 to 1415, as a member of the Hungarian delegation. Peter Tibai died shortly before November 1419. He was succeeded as parish priest by his nephew Peter Csapi already in that year.

== Sources ==
- Csikós, Veronika (2011). "A történeti Észak-Szatmár egyházi építészete [The Church Architecture of historical Northern Szatmár]". In Kollár, Tibor (ed.). Középkori egyházi építészet Szatmárban. Középkori templomok útja Szabolcs-Szatmár-Bereg és Szatmár megyékben (in Hungarian). Szabolcs-Szatmár-Bereg Megyei Önkormányzat. pp. 181–237. ISBN 978-963-081279-5.
- Engel, Pál (1996). Magyarország világi archontológiája, 1301–1457, I. [Secular Archontology of Hungary, 1301–1457, Volume I] (in Hungarian). História, MTA Történettudományi Intézete. ISBN 963-8312-44-0.
- Engel, Pál (1998). A nemesi társadalom a középkori Ung megyében [The Noble Society in Medieval Ung County] (in Hungarian). Társadalom- és művelődéstörténeti tanulmányok 25., MTA Történettudományi Intézete. ISBN 963-8312-59-9.
- Nagy, Gyula, ed. (1887). A nagymihályi és sztárai gróf Sztáray család oklevéltára. Első kötet 1234–1396 [The Diploma Archive of the Count Sztáray de Nagymihály et Sztára Family. Volume One: 1234–1396] (in Hungarian). Count Antal Sztáray.
- Nagy, Gyula, ed. (1889). A nagymihályi és sztárai gróf Sztáray család oklevéltára. Második kötet 1397–1457 [The Diploma Archive of the Count Sztáray de Nagymihály et Sztára Family. Volume Two: 1397–1457] (in Hungarian). Count Antal Sztáray.
