= George Tibai =

Hungarian nobleman

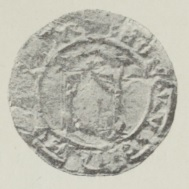
- Seal of George Tibai, 1370

Vice-ispán of Ung
- Reign: 1362–1370
- Predecessor: Lucas, son of Nicholas
- Successor: John Tibai
- Died: January/March 1370
- Noble family: House of Tibai
- Spouse: Margaret Csapi
- Issue: John I Peter II; Jakó; Ladislaus II; Catherine; Clara; Anne
- Father: Lawrence I Tibai
- Mother: daughter of magister Kakas

George Tibai (also Nagymihályi, Hungarian: Tibai György; died January/March 1370) was a Hungarian nobleman in the 14th century, who served as vice-ispán of Ung County from 1362 until his death.

== Career ==
George was born into the Tibai noble family, which originated from the Nagymihály branch of the gens (clan) Kaplon. His father was Lawrence (I), the first member of the family, himself a son of Andrew Kaplon. His mother was an unidentified daughter of a certain magister Kakas. George had three brothers: Peter, Ladislaus "the Devil" and Nicholas. The latter two were ancestors of the Ördög (also Vajnatinai, later Tibai) and Lucskai families, respectively.

The name of George first appears in contemporary records in 1335. In that year, he contested the land division between various members of the Nagymihály branch. Thereafter, his second cousins agreed to a new division among the branch's landholdings in 1336. The agreement was legally confirmed by Palatine William Drugeth in 1337. Thereafter, Lawrence and his sons mainly resided in Tiba in Ung County (present-day Tibava, Slovakia), adopting their family name after the settlement. Despite the land division, relationship remained tense between members of the branch. In 1343, George and his brothers, Ladislaus and Nicholas protested against that their cousins, John II and Ernye (sons of Jakó IV) refused to hand over the estate Gelénes in Szatmár County to them, despite the 1336 agreement. George lost a lawsuit for the estate Reviscse (today Blatné Revištia, Slovakia) in 1344. In the same year, there were also disputes regarding the borders of Tiba, Reviscse, Simonháza, Zalacska (today Zalužice, Slovakia) and Jeszenő (today Jasenov, Slovakia) between the families of the Nagymihály branch. Judge royal Paul Nagymartoni ruled against George, Nicholas and Ladislaus in this litigation too. In the subsequent years, George had many legal conflicts with his cousin John (II) Nagymihályi (also Gézsényi), the son of Jakó (IV).

George entered the service of the powerful Lackfi family. As their familiaris, George served as vice-ispán of Ung County under ispáns Paul I and Nicholas I Lackfi from 1362 to 1370. George Tibai died between January and March 1370. He was succeeded as vice-ispán by his eldest son John I, who also inherited his seal.

== Family ==
George Tibai married Margaret Csapi from the gens (clan) Baksa. Their eldest son John (I) administered Ung County from 1387 to 1396. He was killed in the Battle of Nicopolis. Jakó and Ladislaus (II) died without male descendants. Peter entered ecclesiastical service, he was vicar of Nagybánya (today Baia Mare, Romania). He was the last male member of George's branch. His three daughters, Catherine, Clara and Anne married members of the local Ung County nobility, Nicholas Csapi, Stephen Butkai and Peter Ramocsa de Szeretva, respectively.

== Sources ==
- Engel, Pál (1996). Magyarország világi archontológiája, 1301–1457, I. [Secular Archontology of Hungary, 1301–1457, Volume I] (in Hungarian). História, MTA Történettudományi Intézete. ISBN 963-8312-44-0.
- Engel, Pál (1998). A nemesi társadalom a középkori Ung megyében [The Noble Society in Medieval Ung County] (in Hungarian). Társadalom- és művelődéstörténeti tanulmányok 25., MTA Történettudományi Intézete. ISBN 963-8312-59-9.
- Karácsonyi, János (1901). A magyar nemzetségek a XIV. század közepéig. II. kötet [The Hungarian genera until the middle of the 14th century, Vol. 2] (in Hungarian). Hungarian Academy of Sciences.
- Nagy, Gyula, ed. (1887). A nagymihályi és sztárai gróf Sztáray család oklevéltára. Első kötet 1234–1396 [The Diploma Archive of the Count Sztáray de Nagymihály et Sztára Family. Volume One: 1234–1396] (in Hungarian). Count Antal Sztáray.
