= Church of the Assumption of the Virgin Mary, Staré =

Church in Košice Region, Slovakia

Coordinates: 48°52′N 21°52′E

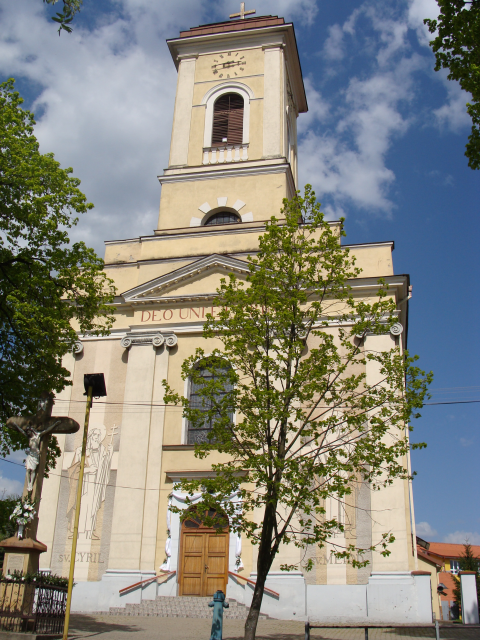
Church of the Blessed Virgin Mary in Stare (Slovakia)

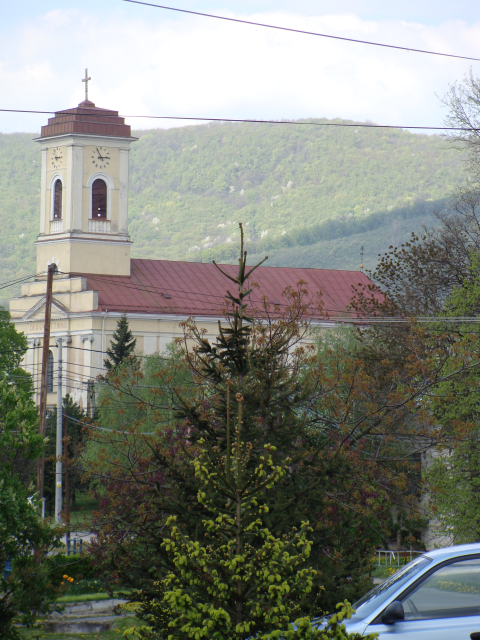

The Church of the Assumption of the Virgin Mary is a parish church in Staré, Slovakia. The current building was built between 1811 and 1842 in the classicist style.

The parish was established in the 13th century. The first written account is from 1332 to 1337. In 1335, the village consisted of Horné Staré and Kostolné Staré with St. Anne church. It was later devoted to the translation of the Virgin Mary, Saint Anne and Saint Stanislav, who was bishop and martyr. This church had a choir, a sacristy and a tower with two bells. The parish lapsed in the late 17th century and was renewed in 1721.

It is a single-aisle building with segmental closure of the presbytery. The ground plan is longitudinal. The sanctuary is a gently curved five-flanks closure to which adjoin two aisle sacristies. The main face of the building attaches a tower and is divided to four pilasters. On the top is a massive cross. In the middle of its frontal face is the main portal "DEO UNI ET TRINO" which means "To triunity God". On either side of the main gate in masonry are large sculptures of Saints Cyril and Methodius.

The window-panes are of Saint Dominic Sávio and Saint Maria Goretti, Saint Peter and Saint Paul, Saint Monica and Saint Susanna on the left and Saint John the Baptist and Saint Joseph, Saint Cyril and Saint Methodius, Saint Michael on the right.
