= Nikola IV Frankopan =

Croatian nobleman

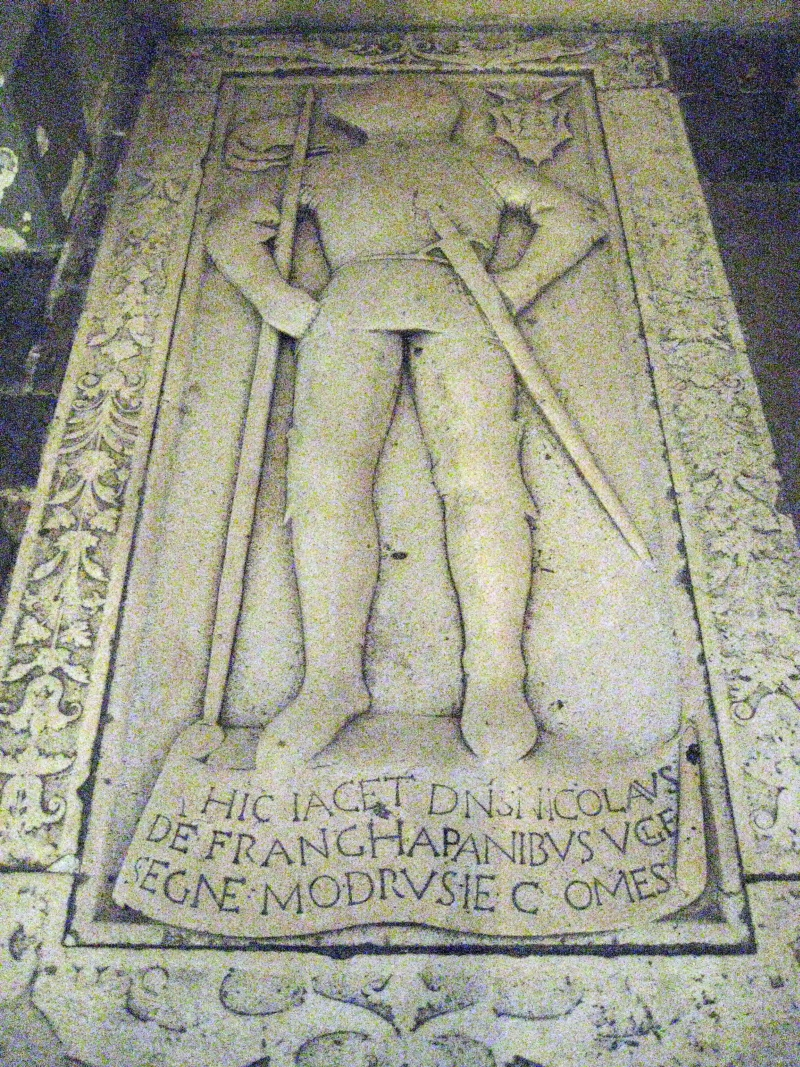
- Gravestone of Nikola IV Frankopan (Nicolaus de Franghapanibus)

Ban of Croatia
- In office 1426 – 26 June 1432
- Preceded by: Albert Nagymihályi
- Succeeded by: Ivan VI Frankopan

Personal details
- Born: c. 1360
- Died: 26 June 1432
- Spouse(s): Doroteja Gorjanski; Marta Iločka
- Parent(s): Ivan V of Krk; Anna of Gorizia

Nicola Frangipani in Croatian language Nikola IV Frankopan (Hungarian: Frangepán Miklós; c.1360 – 26 June 1432) was a Croatian nobleman and the Ban of Croatia and Dalmatia from 1426 to 1432.

He began as a lord of most of northern Croatia as count of Senj and Modruš, and later acquired much of the country through loans to king Sigismund totalling around 46,000 ducats. Thus, Nikola Frankopan came into possession of most of Croatia, including Bihać and Knin, with the rest being in the hands of the Nelipić and Kurjaković noble families.

During his visit to the Papal States, he received recognition for being a descendant of the old Roman patrician family Frangipani, after whom he took their name and symbol.

Nikola Frankopan is also regarded as the founder of the town of Crikvenica in 1412.

== Biography ==
He was born around 1360 as the only son of Ivan V Frankopan and his wife Anna, daughter of count Meinhard of Gorizia. After the death of his father in 1393, he inherited all of his estates and administered them together with his mother. During this time he is mentioned as duke of Krk and Modruš, and was also later confirmed as the duke of Rab. His dominion was further extended with the purchase of Ribnik, near the town of Ozalj, for 9000 ducats, from the nobleman Mikac Prodavić.

During the dynastic struggle for the Hungarian-Croatian kingship, he was initially supportive of Ladislaus of Naples, but from 1403, he sided with Sigismund. Two years later, he married his first wife Dorothea of Gara, who was the daughter of the Palatine of Hungary Nicholas Garay. In 1411, he made a pact with nobleman Ivaniš Nelipić against Ladislaus of Naples. In this pact, he bethrothed his eldest son Ivan VI Frankopan to Ivaniš's daughter Catherine.

In the subsequent year, he initiated the reconstruction of the church of Saint Mary in today's Crikvenica and built the adjacent monastery. There he brought the members of the Pauline Order and granted them the monastery in a charter dated August 14, 1412 which is the oldest record of the towns name. The monastery was the center which connected the surrounding villages and from which today's town grew into.

His lands and estates were ravaged during the second war between the king and the Republic of Venice which took place between 1418 and 1420. He soon also came into conflict with the Counts of Celje, who took parts of Nikola's lands by claiming dowry. This was eventually settled at the court of king Sigismund in Buda.

His domains included the Island of Krk, the districts of Vinodol, Modruš, Senj, Gacka, and Lika in Croatia. His properties also extended to the towns of Cetin, Slunj and Ozalj in Slavonia, bought from king Sigismund for 17,000 ducats in 1397. Upon his appointment as Ban of Croatia and Dalmatia in 1426, king Sigismund pawned him in return for a loan of 28,000 ducats, the town of Bihać on Una river, Knin, Lapacgrad, Vrlika, Ostrovica (near Bribir), Skradin, the county of Luk between Zrmanja and Krka rivers and the district of Poljice. He subsequently confirmed this in 1431, for another loan of 14,000 ducats. These acts brought the majority of the territories of the Kingdom of Croatia and Dalmatia into Nikola Frankopan's ownership, with the rest being the possession of the Nelipić and Kurjaković noble families.

In 1422, he took the surname Frangipani (Frankopan), which is what all his successors henceforth called themselves. Two years later he visited Rome to have pope Martin V confirm him as a legal descendant of the old Roman patrician family Frangipane, who in turn claimed to have descended from the ancient gentis Anici. At this point, Nikola also had his family coat of arms altered for this purpose.

In Slavonia, the authority of Ban was held by count Hermann of Celje (Cilli) (1423–1435), father-in-law of king Sigismund. Hermann was the master of a large part of Slavonia. The two powerful clans clashed because of family quarrels. Each of them had partisans among the powerful barons. Thus two factions were formed ready to start a bloody feud. Those who sided with the Counts of Celje (Cilli) strove to extend their sway also over Croatia and to annihilate the Frangipani family members as a way to over take their lands, titles and to shift the balance of power towards their favor.

The outbreak of civil war was prevented by Sigismund's return from abroad. Peace was further consolidated when Nikola died on June 26, 1432. Some rumors were that he was murdered by opposing Barons loyal to Hermann II of Celje.

He was survived by nine sons and daughters. The founder of this branch of the Frangipani family supplied great leaders and Generals of Croatian history. Nikola Frankopan was very politically skillful. He arranged special marriages for his children and permanently set his family members in positions to look after the vast number of properties that he acquired. Their political opponents used propaganda to create strife for the family. Some of the accusations included that some family members had converted to Islam.

== See also ==
- Frankopan family tree
- History of Croatia
- List of rulers of Croatia

Preceded by Albert Nagymihályi	Ban of Croatia; 1426-1432	Succeeded by Ivan VI Frankopan
