= Ivan VI Frankopan =

Croatian nobleman

Ban of Croatia
- In office 1432–1436

Personal details
- Died: 20 November 1436
- Parent(s): Nikola Frankopan, Dorottya Garai

Giovanni Frangipani (known in Croatian as Ivan VI Frankopan, Ivan Anž Frankapan, or Ivaniš; died 20 November 1436) was a Croatian nobleman who ruled as Ban of Croatia from 1432 to 1436. He was one of the nine sons of the Croatian viceroy, Nikola Frankopan. and the Hungarian Dorottya Garai. Scandinavian sources use the names Gian Franchi and Johan Franke when discussing him; elsewhere Giovanni Franco or (Swedish: Johan Vale) is used. He was a bailiff in service of Eric of Pomerania who in the 1420s held Stegeborg.

== Early history ==
King Eric met Franco in Venice on his way on his pilgrimage to Jerusalem, and was designated an interpreter. After the arrival in Jerusalem, the King was dubbed Knight of the Holy Sepulchre by the Franciscan Custos of the Holy Land, and subsequently himself dubbed his pilgrim fellows, among them Ivan Anz Frankopan.

After the journey to Jerusalem, Franco then come to the Nordic countries and became bailiff at Stegeborg.

In 1432, a Venetian ships crew shipwrecked off the coast of Norway to Stegeborg after a journey to Jämtland, Dalarna and Västmanland. He took care of them, and took, among other things with them to Vadstena for a church celebration, he gave them parting gifts and housed them in farms during their journey to Lödöse.

Franco also had Köpingshus fief, and here he found himself in Engelbrekt rebellion, so withdrew before Engelbrecht in 1434 conquered and burned the castle. Later, he also left Stegsholm.

== Controversy over legacy ==
When wealthy Prince Ivaniš Nelipić, the last male member of the illustrious House of Nelipić, died in 1434, the problem of inheritance became acute. According to his will, his only daughter, Princess Catherine or Margarita Nelipić, was to inherit all of his extensive possessions from the Velebit ranges to Cetina river.

Her patrimony was argued and eventually shared by Frankopan. In spite of the legality of this bequest, and his consent to the marriage upon request of the late Ivaniš Nelipić, King Sigismund denounced the testament and demanded that Frankopan turn over to him the legacy of his wife's inheritance. When Frankopan refused to obey, King Sigismund proclaimed him a rebel and deprived him of all honors and possessions. Then, he ordered the Banus of Slavonia Matko Talovats to subdue him by force. Thus, in 1436, civil war broke out in Croatia. However, it was short lived.

Frankopan sought the assistance of the pope. With the support of his good friend and former employer, Eric of Pomerania who became King of Sweden, he triumphed over King Sigismund. Suddenly, Frankopan died, and this halted hostilities and provided a decisive victory for King Sigismund. It was rumored that the King and sent an agent to poison Frankopan. King Sigismund further gloated over his victory by causing further damages to the Frankopan family when he gave away the legacy of Princess Catherine to Talovats and his brothers, Peter, Frank, and John.

When the Frankopan family came to the aid of the Nelipić's family, who was trying to protect the property from King Sigismund, he spread propaganda that Frankopan had poisoned his father-in-law, Nelipić, and Radić, a close relative to the Frankopan family. He claimed that this was how the family had acquired the vast wealth. He spread the ugly rumor that he had not only poisoned, but robbed them of their wealth.

== See also ==
- Frankopan family tree
- Ivan Frankopan Cetinski

Preceded by Nikola Frankopan	Ban of Croatia; 1432-1436	Succeeded by
