= Vyšné Remety =

Village and municipality in Slovakia

Vyšné Remety Jeszenőremete
- Municipality
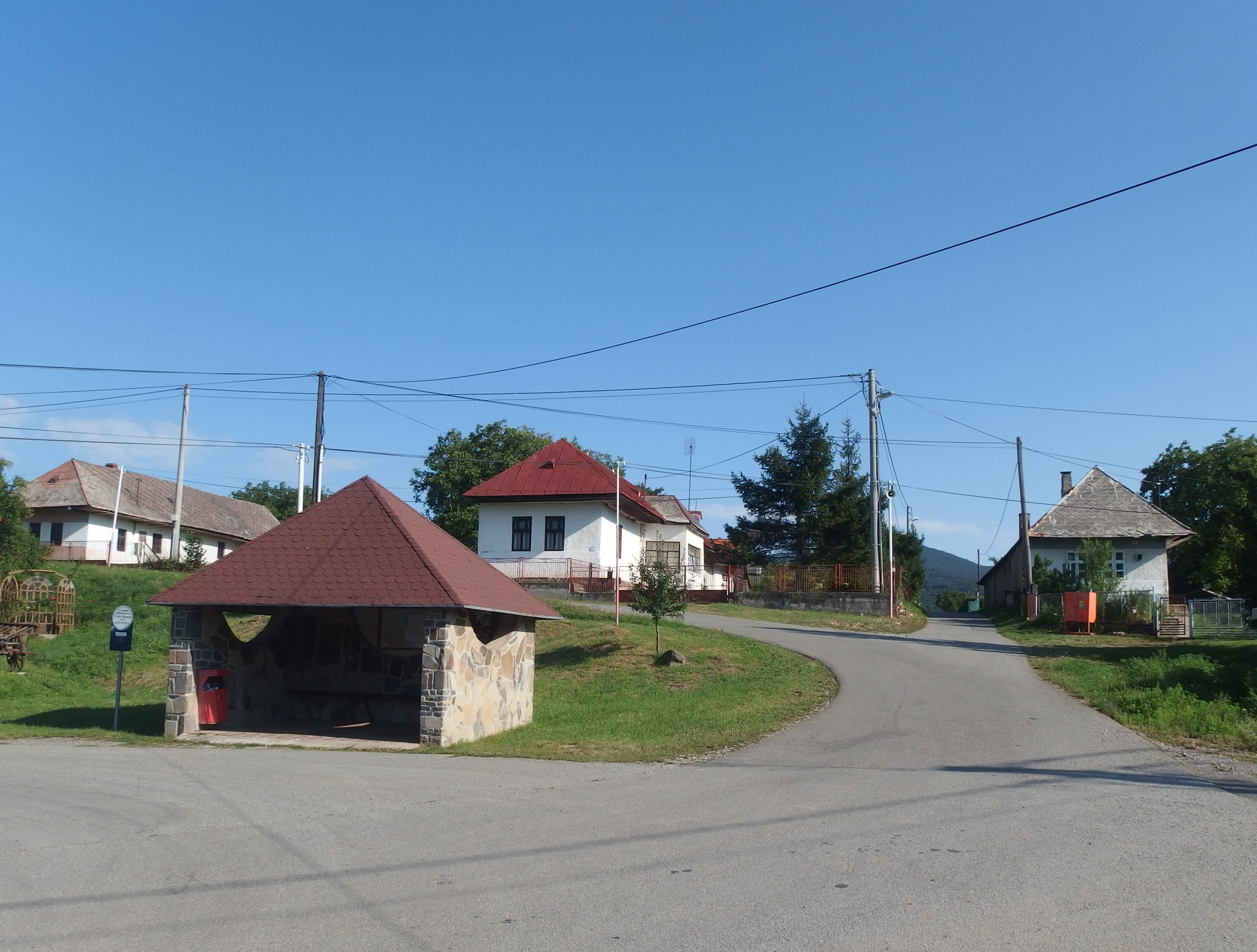

- Flag

- Location of Vyšné Remety in the Košice Region Location of Vyšné Remety in Slovakia
- Coordinates: 48.83°N 22.17°E
- Country: Slovakia
- Region: Košice Region
- District: Sobrance District
- First mentioned: 1418

Area
  - Total: 5.36 km^{2} (2.07 sq mi)
- Elevation: 208 m (682 ft)

Population (2025)
  - Total: 382
- Time zone: UTC+1 (CET)
  - Summer (DST): UTC+2 (CEST)
- Postal code: 724 1
- Area code: +421 56
- Vehicle registration plate (until 2022): SO
- Website: www.vysne-remety.sk

Vyšné Remety (Hungarian: Jeszenőremete) is a village and municipality in the Sobrance District in the Košice Region of east Slovakia.

== History ==
In historical records the village was first mentioned in 1418.

== Geography ==
The municipality lies at an altitude of 208 metres (682 ft) and covers an area of 5.36 km^{2} (2.07 sq mi) (2025).

== Population ==
Population statistic (10 years)
Year	1995	2005	2015	2025
Count	431	417	415	382
Difference		−3.24%	−0.47%	−7.95%

Population statistic
Year	2024	2025
Count	387	382
Difference		−1.29%

It has a population of 382 people (31 December 2025).

=== Ethnicity ===
Census 2021 (1+ %)
Ethnicity	Number	Fraction
Slovak	378	93.79%
Not found out	18	4.46%
Ukrainian	5	1.24%
Total	403	

In year 2021 was 403 people by ethnicity 378 as Slovak, 18 as Not found out, 5 as Ukrainian, 2 as Russian, 1 as Rusyn, 1 as Polish and 1 as Hungarian.

Note on population: The difference values of population numbers in the table "Population statistic" and in the sections "Ethnicity" & "Religion" is caused by the use of various statistical methods.

=== Religion ===
Census 2021 (1+ %)
Religion	Number	Fraction
Greek Catholic Church	243	60.3%
Roman Catholic Church	112	27.79%
None	19	4.71%
Not found out	18	4.47%
Total	403	

In year 2021 was 403 people by religion 243 from Greek Catholic Church, 112 from Roman Catholic Church, 19 from None, 18 from Not found out, 4 from Church of the Brethren, 2 from Eastern Orthodox Church, 2 from Evangelical Church, 1 from Calvinist Church, 1 from Other and not ascertained christian church and 1 from Jehovah's Witnesses.

== Facilities ==
The village has a public library and a soccer pitch.
