= Petrovce nad Laborcom =

Village and municipality in Slovakia

Petrovce nad Laborcom Petróc
- Municipality
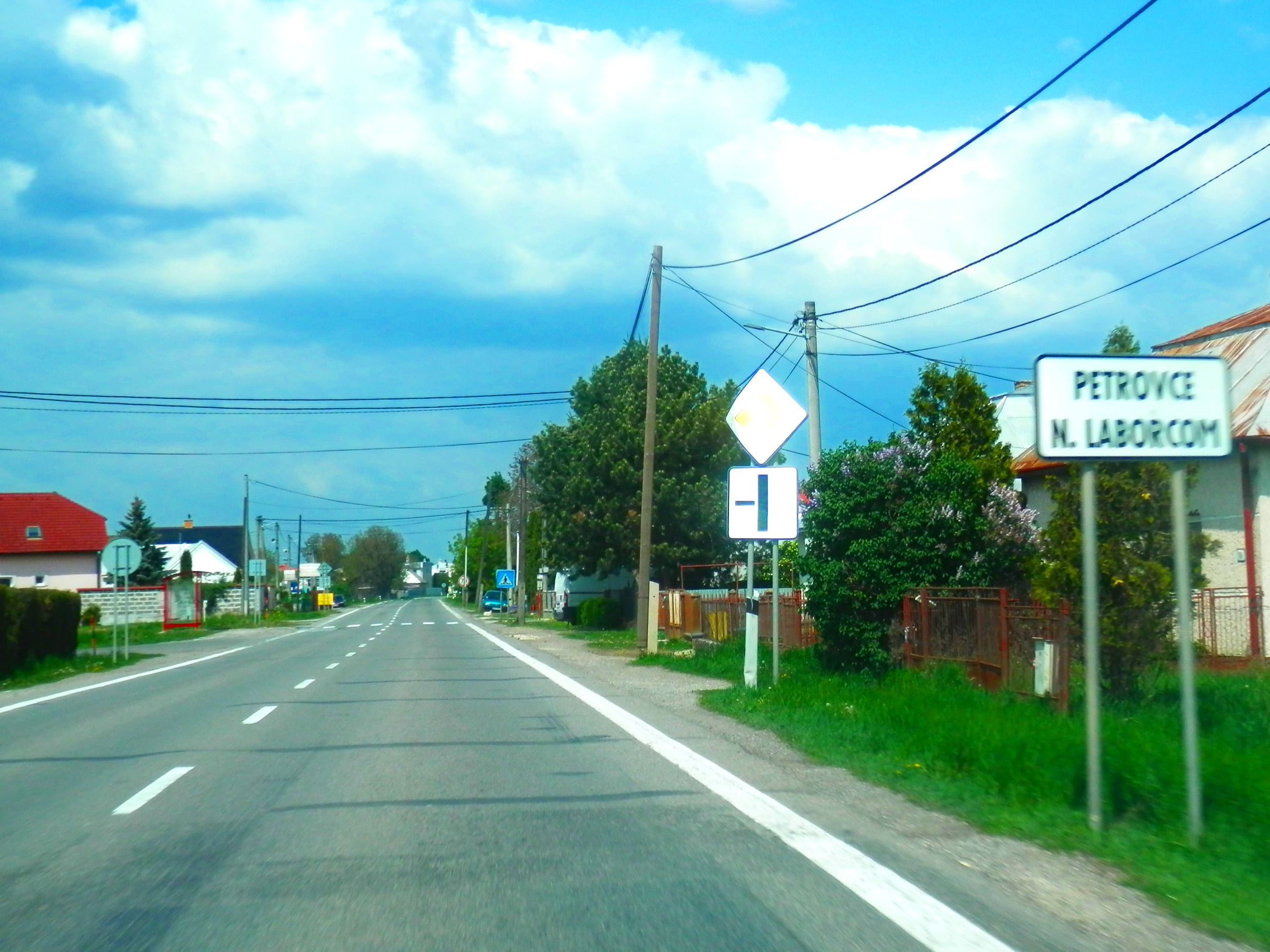

- Flag

- Location of Petrovce nad Laborcom in the Košice Region Location of Petrovce nad Laborcom in Slovakia
- Coordinates: 48.80°N 21.88°E
- Country: Slovakia
- Region: Košice Region
- District: Michalovce District
- First mentioned: 1254

Area
  - Total: 10.21 km^{2} (3.94 sq mi)
- Elevation: 119 m (390 ft)

Population (2025)
  - Total: 1,123
- Time zone: UTC+1 (CET)
  - Summer (DST): UTC+2 (CEST)
- Postal code: 722 1
- Area code: +421 56
- Vehicle registration plate (until 2022): MI
- Website: obecpnl.eu

Petrovce nad Laborcom (Hungarian: Petróc) is a village and municipality in Michalovce District in the Košice Region of eastern Slovakia.

== History ==
In historical records the village was first mentioned in 1254.

== Geography ==
The municipality lies at an altitude of 119 metres (390 ft) and covers an area of 10.21 km^{2} (3.94 sq mi) (2025).

== Population ==
Population statistic (10 years)
Year	1995	2005	2015	2025
Count	904	933	1024	1123
Difference		+3.20%	+9.75%	+9.66%

Population statistic
Year	2024	2025
Count	1128	1123
Difference		−0.44%

It has a population of 1123 people (31 December 2025).

=== Ethnicity ===
Census 2021 (1+ %)
Ethnicity	Number	Fraction
Slovak	1029	96.61%
Romani	32	3%
Not found out	26	2.44%
Total	1065	

In year 2021 was 1065 people by ethnicity 1029 as Slovak, 32 as Romani, 26 as Not found out, 10 as Rusyn, 4 as Other, 3 as Ukrainian, 3 as Hungarian, 1 as Czech and 1 as Turkish.

Note on population: The difference values of population numbers in the table "Population statistic" and in the sections "Ethnicity" & "Religion" is caused by the use of various statistical methods.

=== Religion ===
Census 2021 (1+ %)
Religion	Number	Fraction
Roman Catholic Church	748	70.23%
Greek Catholic Church	182	17.09%
None	69	6.48%
Not found out	26	2.44%
Eastern Orthodox Church	11	1.03%
Total	1065	

In year 2021 was 1065 people by religion 748 from Roman Catholic Church, 182 from Greek Catholic Church, 69 from None, 26 from Not found out, 11 from Eastern Orthodox Church, 9 from Evangelical Church, 8 from Christian Congregations in Slovakia, 7 from Calvinist Church, 1 from Old Catholic Church, 1 from Other and not ascertained christian church, 1 from Jehovah's Witnesses, 1 from United Methodist Church and 1 from Ad hoc movements.

== Culture ==
The village has a small public library and a football pitch.

== Transport ==
The village has a small railway station and two bus stops.

The village lies on the main road between Michalovce and Humenné, with regular bus services between the two towns.

== Gallery ==
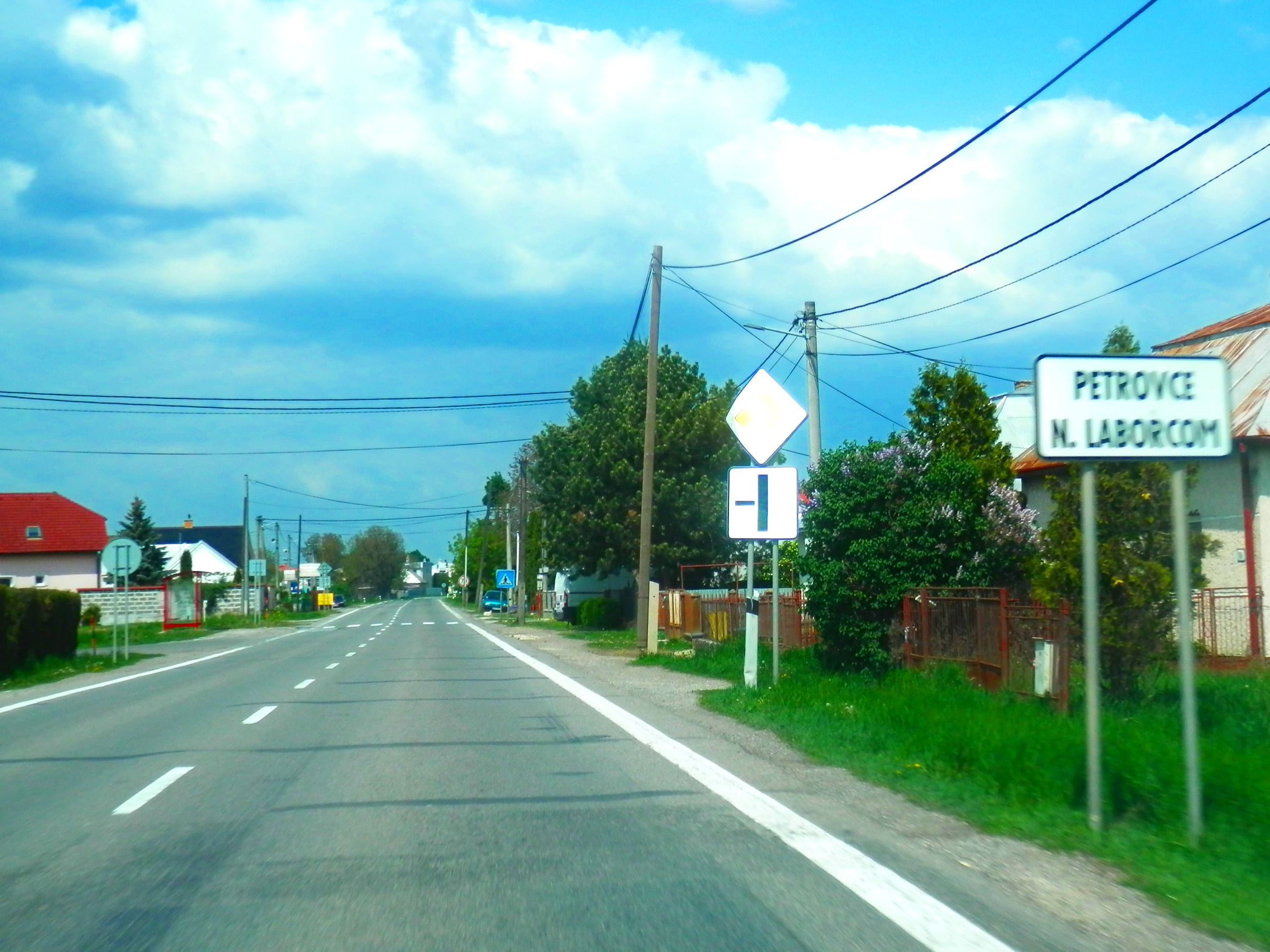
Entering Petrovce nad Laborcom

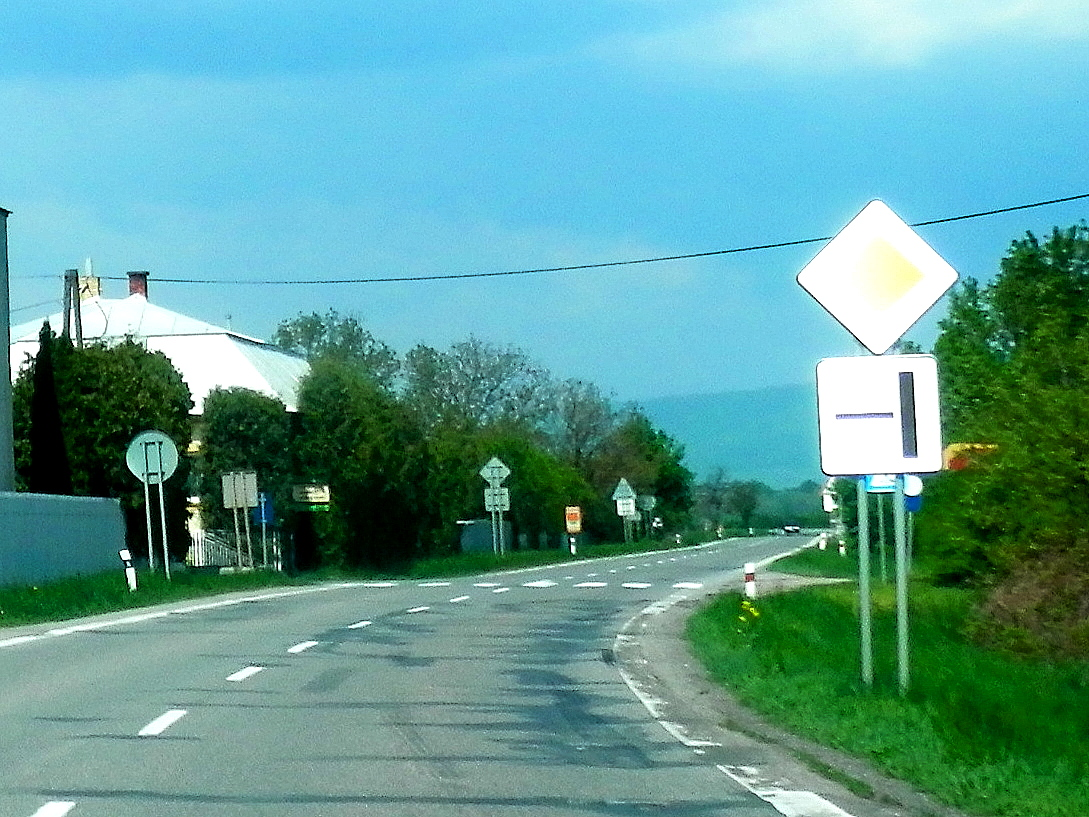
Bus stop and small crossroads leading into a street of the village proper

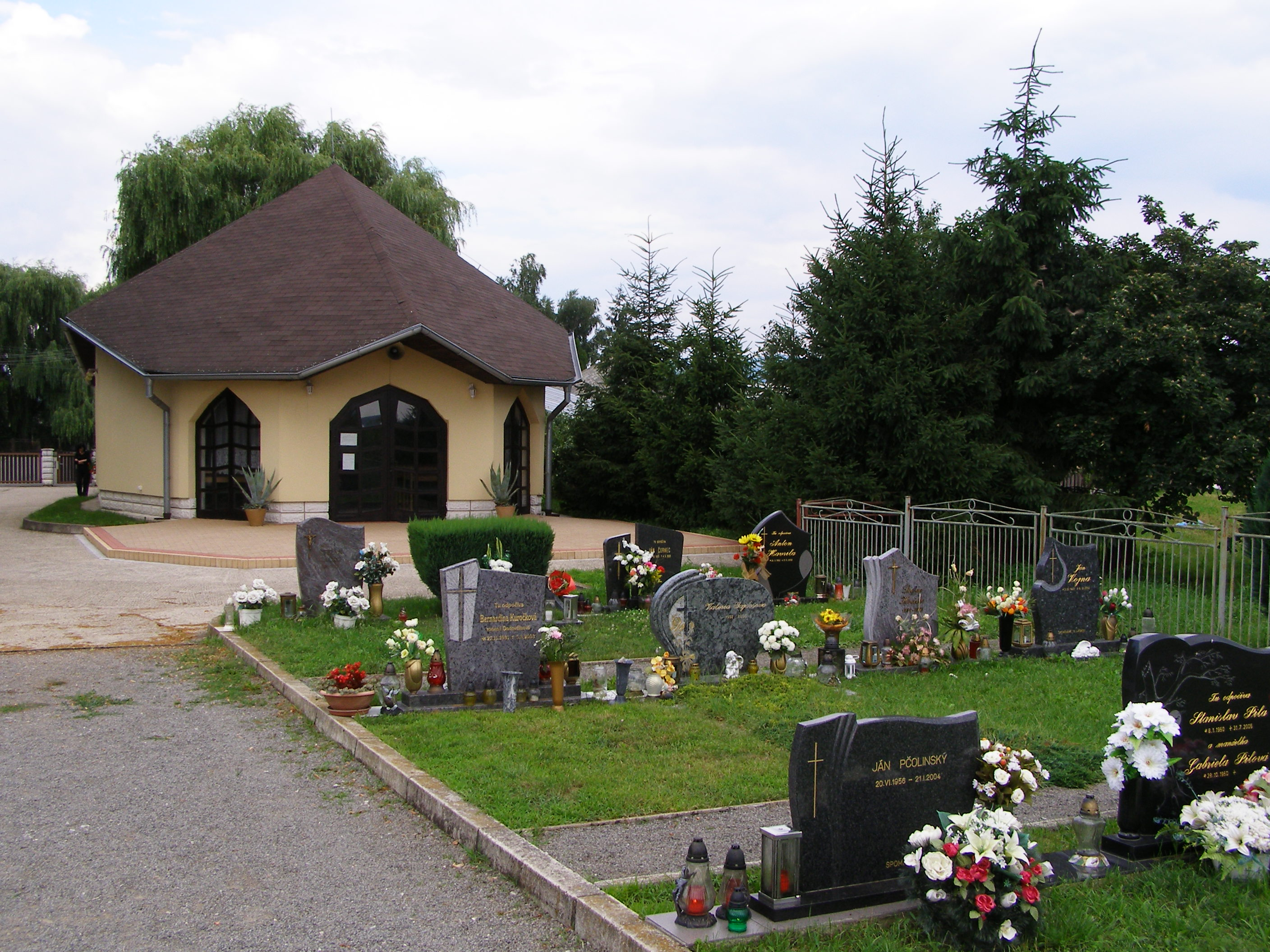
Funeral home and part of the cemetery in Petrovce nad Laborcom

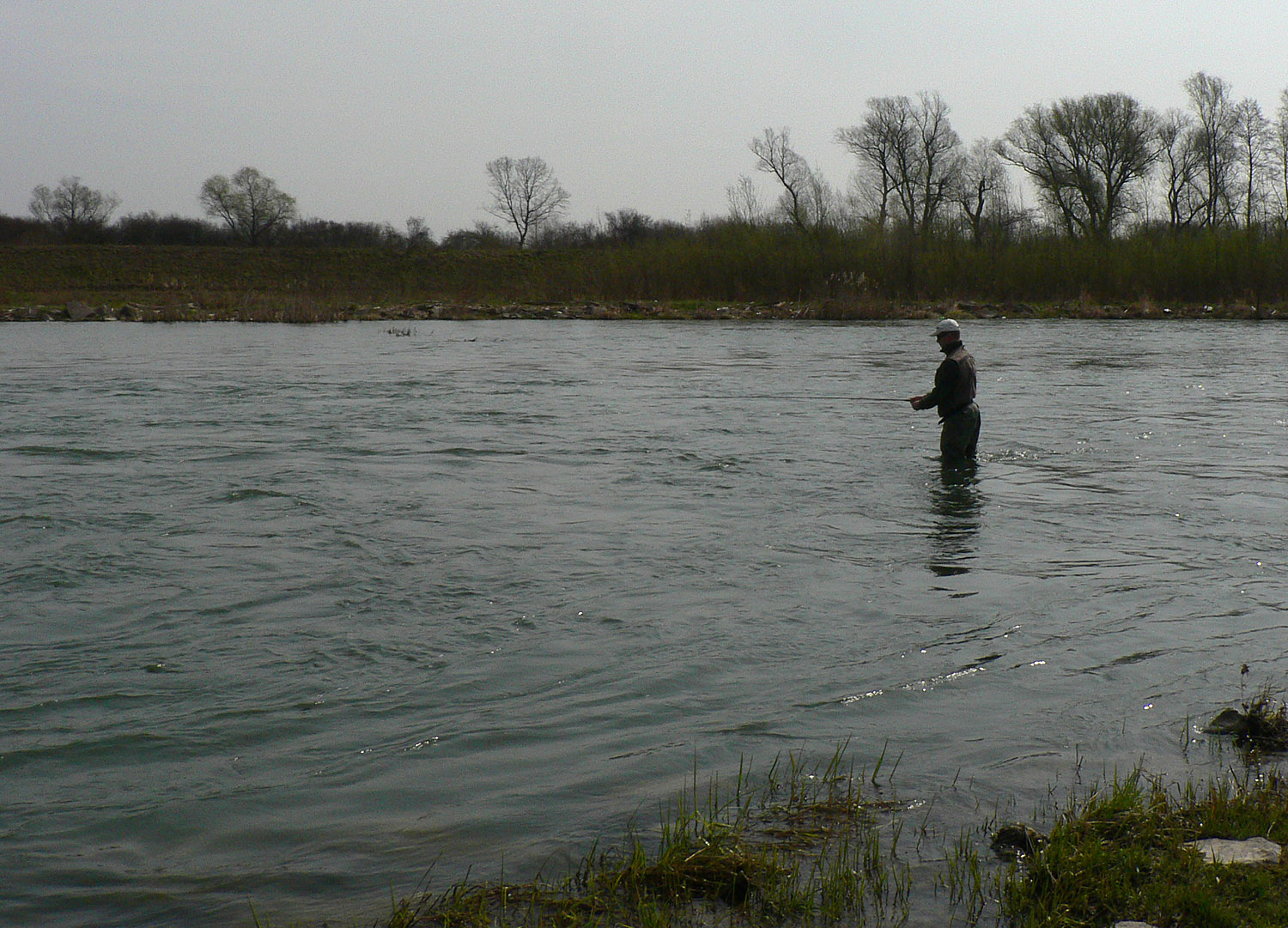
Fishing on the Laborec river near Petrovce
