= Hažín =

Village and municipality in Slovakia

Hažín Gezsény
- Municipality
- Flag

- Location of Hažín in the Košice Region Location of Hažín in Slovakia
- Coordinates: 48.75°N 22.02°E
- Country: Slovakia
- Region: Košice Region
- District: Michalovce District
- First mentioned: 1336

Area
  - Total: 16.31 km^{2} (6.30 sq mi)
- Elevation: 120 m (390 ft)

Population (2025)
  - Total: 468
- Time zone: UTC+1 (CET)
  - Summer (DST): UTC+2 (CEST)
- Postal code: 723 4
- Area code: +421 56
- Vehicle registration plate (until 2022): MI
- Website: www.hazin.sk

Hažín (Hungarian: Gezsény) is a village and municipality in Michalovce District in the Kosice Region of eastern Slovakia.

== History ==
In historical records the village was first mentioned in 1336. Before the establishment of independent Czechoslovakia in 1918, it was part of Ung County within the Kingdom of Hungary.

== Geography ==
The municipality lies at an altitude of 120 metres (390 ft) and covers an area of 16.31 km^{2} (6.30 sq mi) (2025).

== Population ==
Population statistic (10 years)
Year	1995	2005	2015	2025
Count	429	454	475	468
Difference		+5.82%	+4.62%	−1.47%

Population statistic
Year	2024	2025
Count	466	468
Difference		+0.42%

It has a population of 468 people (31 December 2025).

=== Ethnicity ===
Census 2021 (1+ %)
Ethnicity	Number	Fraction
Slovak	473	98.13%
Rusyn	8	1.65%
Not found out	5	1.03%
Total	482	

In year 2021 was 482 people by ethnicity 473 as Slovak, 8 as Rusyn, 5 as Not found out, 2 as Ukrainian, 2 as Other, 1 as Czech and 1 as Romani.

Note on population: The difference values of population numbers in the table "Population statistic" and in the sections "Ethnicity" & "Religion" is caused by the use of various statistical methods.

=== Religion ===
Census 2021 (1+ %)
Religion	Number	Fraction
Roman Catholic Church	176	36.51%
Greek Catholic Church	97	20.12%
Eastern Orthodox Church	79	16.39%
None	68	14.11%
Calvinist Church	18	3.73%
Not found out	16	3.32%
Evangelical Church	12	2.49%
Jehovah's Witnesses	7	1.45%
Other and not ascertained christian church	5	1.04%
Total	482	

In year 2021 was 482 people by religion 176 from Roman Catholic Church, 97 from Greek Catholic Church, 79 from Eastern Orthodox Church, 68 from None, 18 from Calvinist Church, 16 from Not found out, 12 from Evangelical Church, 7 from Jehovah's Witnesses, 5 from Other and not ascertained christian church, 3 from Seventh-day Adventist Church and 1 from Ad hoc movements.

== Culture ==
The village has a small public library and food stores. It also has a car repair shop.

== Sports ==
The village has a football pitch, fitness, tennis court and children's playground. Pavol Regenda, a hockey player for the NHL team San Jose Sharks, was raised here.

== Transport ==
The nearest railway station is 12 kilometres away at Michalovce.

== Genealogical resources ==
The records for genealogical research are available at the state archive "Statny Archiv in Presov, Slovakia"

- Roman Catholic church records (births/marriages/deaths): 1824-1912 (parish B)
- Greek Catholic church records (births/marriages/deaths): 1806-1913 (parish A)
- Reformated church records (births/marriages/deaths): 1747-1940 (parish B)

== See also ==
- List of municipalities and towns in Slovakia
