= Poruba pod Vihorlatom =

Village in Michalovce District, Slovakia

Poruba pod Vihorlatom Németvágás
- Municipality
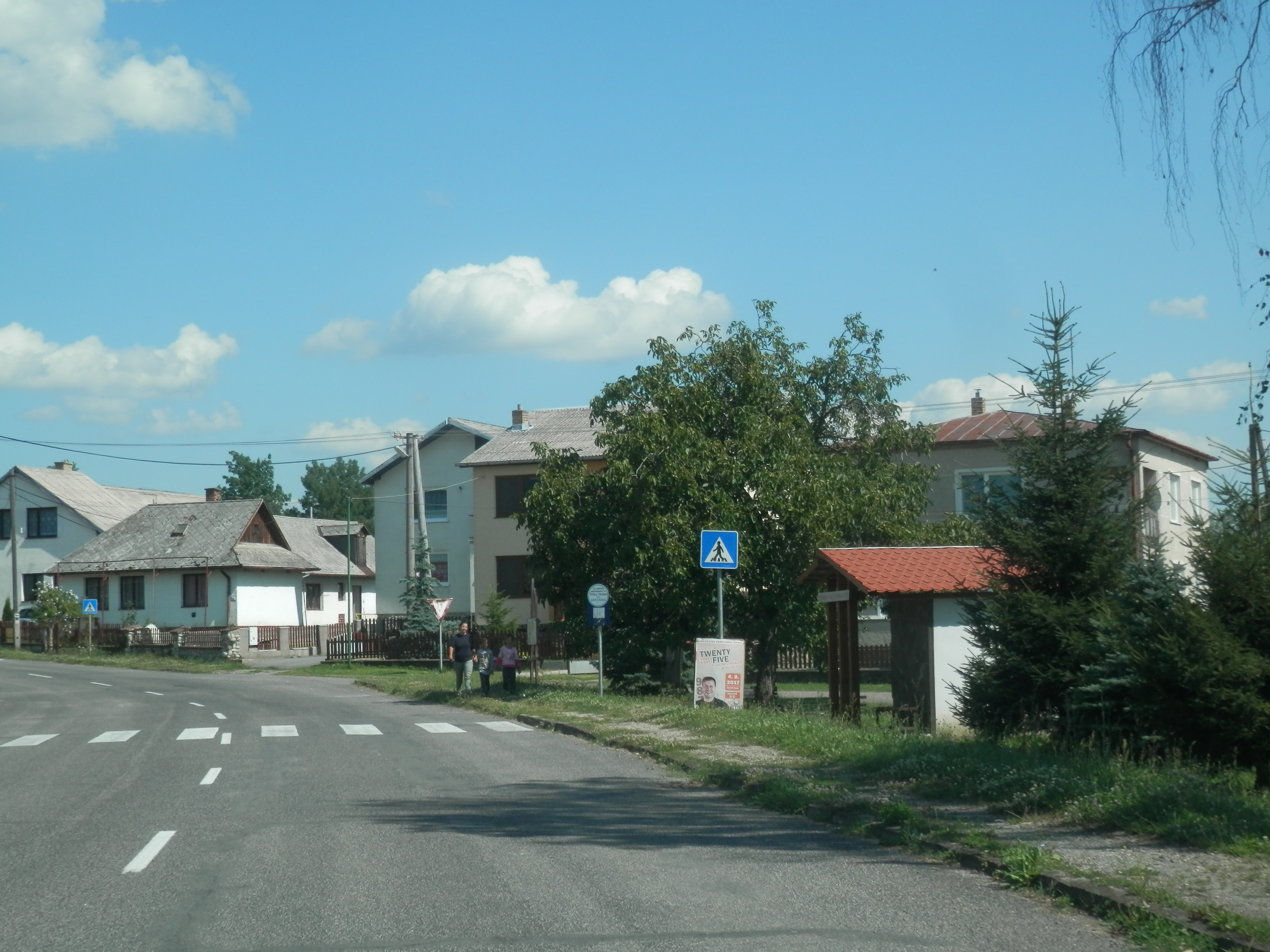

- Flag Coat of arms

- Location of Poruba pod Vihorlatom in the Košice Region Location of Poruba pod Vihorlatom in Slovakia
- Coordinates: 48.83°N 22.15°E
- Country: Slovakia
- Region: Košice Region
- District: Michalovce District
- First mentioned: 1418

Area
  - Total: 20.50 km^{2} (7.92 sq mi)
- Elevation: 200 m (660 ft)

Population (2025)
  - Total: 590
- Time zone: UTC+1 (CET)
  - Summer (DST): UTC+2 (CEST)
- Postal code: 723 2
- Area code: +421 56
- Vehicle registration plate (until 2022): MI
- Website: poruba.eu

Poruba pod Vihorlatom (Hungarian: Németvágás) is a village and municipality in Michalovce District in the Košice Region of eastern Slovakia.

== History ==
In historical records the village was first mentioned in 1418.

== Geography ==
The municipality lies at an altitude of 200 metres (660 ft) and covers an area of 20.50 km^{2} (7.92 sq mi) (2025).

The village lies at the southern foothills of the Vihorlat Mountains.

== Population ==
Population statistic (10 years)
| Year | 1995 | 2005 | 2015 | 2025 |
|---|---|---|---|---|
| Count | 617 | 613 | 623 | 590 |
| Difference | | −0.64% | +1.63% | −5.29% |

Population statistic
| Year | 2024 | 2025 |
|---|---|---|
| Count | 594 | 590 |
| Difference | | −0.67% |

It has a population of 590 people (31 December 2025).

=== Ethnicity ===
Census 2021 (1+ %)
| Ethnicity | Number | Fraction |
|---|---|---|
| Slovak | 591 | 97.52% |
| Rusyn | 9 | 1.48% |
| Total | 606 | |

In year 2021 was 606 people by ethnicity 591 as Slovak, 9 as Rusyn, 5 as Not found out, 4 as Czech, 1 as Ukrainian, 1 as Hungarian and 1 as Bulgarian.

Note on population: The difference values of population numbers in the table "Population statistic" and in the sections "Ethnicity" & "Religion" is caused by the use of various statistical methods.

=== Religion ===
Census 2021 (1+ %)
| Religion | Number | Fraction |
|---|---|---|
| Greek Catholic Church | 446 | 73.6% |
| Roman Catholic Church | 92 | 15.18% |
| None | 30 | 4.95% |
| Eastern Orthodox Church | 16 | 2.64% |
| Not found out | 14 | 2.31% |
| Total | 606 | |

In year 2021 was 606 people by religion 446 from Greek Catholic Church, 92 from Roman Catholic Church, 30 from None, 16 from Eastern Orthodox Church, 14 from Not found out, 5 from Evangelical Church, 2 from Calvinist Church and 1 from Ad hoc movements.

== Culture ==
The village has a small public library, a football pitch.

== Transport ==
The nearest railway station is 24 kilometres away at Michalovce.
