= Vary, Zakarpattia Oblast =

Vary
- Village
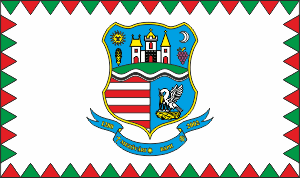
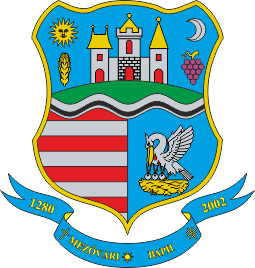
- Flag Coat of arms
- Interactive map of Vary
- Location within Ukraine Location within Zakarpattia Oblast
- Coordinates: 48°7′30″N 22°42′38″E
- Country: Ukraine
- Oblast: Zakarpattia Oblast
- Raion: Berehove Raion

Vary (Ukrainian: Вари, Hungarian: Vári or Mezővári) is a village in Zakarpattia Oblast (province) of western Ukraine. It is located around 17 kilometres (11 mi) southeast of Berehove at the confluence of the rivers Tisza and Borzsova, not far from the Ukrainian-Hungarian border. Administratively, the village belongs to the Berehove Raion, Zakarpattia Oblast. Historically, the name originates from the Hungarian word vár meaning castle. The village was first mentioned as Vári in 1320 and was previously known as Borsovavára.

In 2018, 90% of the population was reported as being Hungarian.
