= Lúčky, Michalovce District =

Lúčky Vámoslucska
- Municipality
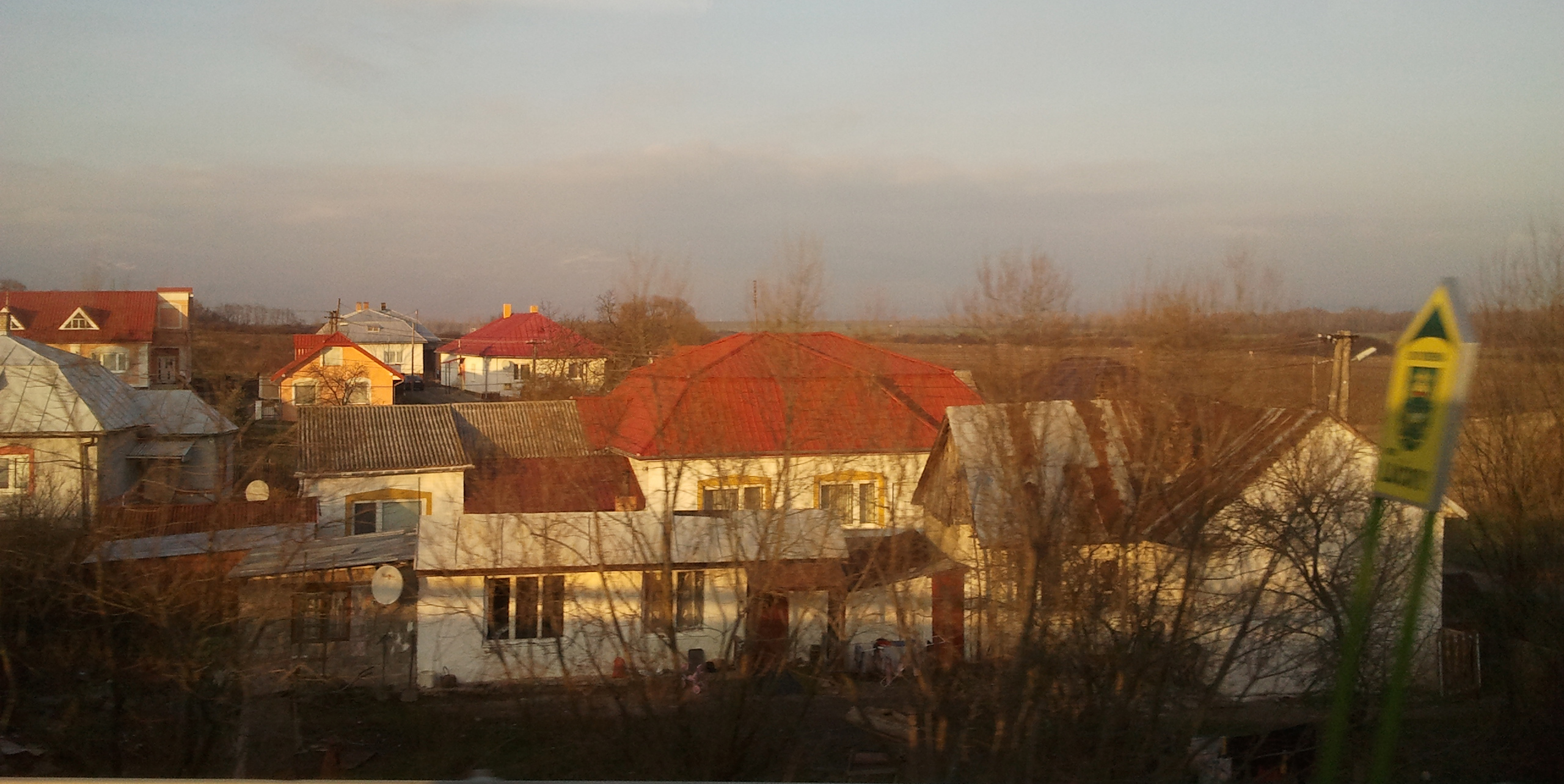

- Flag

- Location of Lúčky in the Košice Region Location of Lúčky in Slovakia
- Coordinates: 48.77°N 22.04°E
- Country: Slovakia
- Region: Košice Region
- District: Michalovce District
- First mentioned: 1336

Area
  - Total: 7.92 km^{2} (3.06 sq mi)
- Elevation: 132 m (433 ft)

Population (2025)
  - Total: 594
- Time zone: UTC+1 (CET)
  - Summer (DST): UTC+2 (CEST)
- Postal code: 723 4
- Area code: +421 56
- Vehicle registration plate (until 2022): MI
- Website: www.obeclucky.eu

Lúčky (Hungarian: Vámoslucska; Yiddish: ליטשיק) is a village and municipality in Michalovce District in the Košice Region of eastern Slovakia.

== History ==
In historical records the village was first mentioned in 1366.

== Geography ==
The municipality lies at an altitude of 132 metres (433 ft) and covers an area of 7.92 km^{2} (3.06 sq mi) (2025).

== Population ==
Population statistic (10 years)
Year	1995	2005	2015	2025
Count	490	519	583	594
Difference		+5.91%	+12.33%	+1.88%

Population statistic
Year	2024	2025
Count	587	594
Difference		+1.19%

It has a population of 594 people (31 December 2025).

=== Ethnicity ===
Census 2021 (1+ %)
Ethnicity	Number	Fraction
Slovak	560	92.86%
Romani	72	11.94%
Not found out	16	2.65%
Total	603	

In year 2021 was 603 people by ethnicity 560 as Slovak, 72 as Romani, 16 as Not found out, 4 as Czech, 4 as Ukrainian, 1 as Rusyn, 1 as Polish, 1 as Hungarian and 1 as Other.

Note on population: The difference values of population numbers in the table "Population statistic" and in the sections "Ethnicity" & "Religion" is caused by the use of various statistical methods.

=== Religion ===
Census 2021 (1+ %)
Religion	Number	Fraction
Roman Catholic Church	332	55.06%
Calvinist Church	74	12.27%
Greek Catholic Church	63	10.45%
Eastern Orthodox Church	52	8.62%
None	38	6.3%
Not found out	13	2.16%
Jehovah's Witnesses	8	1.33%
Seventh-day Adventist Church	7	1.16%
Evangelical Church	6	1%
Total	603	

In year 2021 was 603 people by religion 332 from Roman Catholic Church, 74 from Calvinist Church, 63 from Greek Catholic Church, 52 from Eastern Orthodox Church, 38 from None, 13 from Not found out, 8 from Jehovah's Witnesses, 7 from Seventh-day Adventist Church, 6 from Evangelical Church, 5 from Other and not ascertained christian church, 2 from Christian Congregations in Slovakia, 1 from Other, 1 from Buddhism and 1 from Ad hoc movements.
