= Staré =

Municipality of Slovakia

Staré Sztára
- Municipality
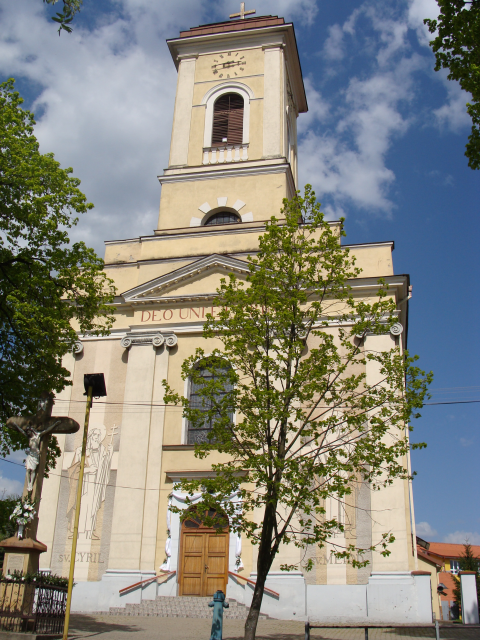
- Church of the Assumption of the Virgin Mary

- Flag

- Location of Staré in the Košice Region Location of Staré in Slovakia
- Coordinates: 48.87°N 21.87°E
- Country: Slovakia
- Region: Košice Region
- District: Michalovce District
- First mentioned: 1273

Area
  - Total: 18.02 km^{2} (6.96 sq mi)
- Elevation: 147 m (482 ft)

Population (2025)
  - Total: 771
- Time zone: UTC+1 (CET)
  - Summer (DST): UTC+2 (CEST)
- Postal code: 722 3
- Area code: +421 56
- Vehicle registration plate (until 2022): MI
- Website: www.obecstare.sk

Staré (Hungarian: Sztára) is a village and municipality in Michalovce District in the Kosice Region of eastern Slovakia.

== History ==
In historical records the village was first mentioned in 1221.

== Geography ==
The municipality lies at an altitude of 147 metres (482 ft) and covers an area of 18.02 km^{2} (6.96 sq mi) (2025).

The name was taken from gróf Sztáray.

== Population ==
Population statistic (10 years)
| Year | 1995 | 2005 | 2015 | 2025 |
|---|---|---|---|---|
| Count | 818 | 801 | 789 | 771 |
| Difference | | −2.07% | −1.49% | −2.28% |

Population statistic
| Year | 2024 | 2025 |
|---|---|---|
| Count | 764 | 771 |
| Difference | | +0.91% |

It has a population of 771 people (31 December 2025).

=== Ethnicity ===
Census 2021 (1+ %)
| Ethnicity | Number | Fraction |
|---|---|---|
| Slovak | 733 | 97.08% |
| Not found out | 20 | 2.64% |
| Total | 755 | |

In year 2021 was 755 people by ethnicity 733 as Slovak, 20 as Not found out, 4 as Rusyn, 3 as Czech, 3 as Other, 2 as Russian, 2 as German, 1 as Ukrainian, 1 as Polish, 1 as Hungarian and 1 as Albanian.

Note on population: The difference values of population numbers in the table "Population statistic" and in the sections "Ethnicity" & "Religion" is caused by the use of various statistical methods.

=== Religion ===
Census 2021 (1+ %)
| Religion | Number | Fraction |
|---|---|---|
| Roman Catholic Church | 655 | 86.75% |
| Greek Catholic Church | 40 | 5.3% |
| None | 28 | 3.71% |
| Not found out | 18 | 2.38% |
| Total | 755 | |

In year 2021 was 755 people by religion 655 from Roman Catholic Church, 40 from Greek Catholic Church, 28 from None, 18 from Not found out, 6 from Evangelical Church, 3 from Eastern Orthodox Church, 2 from Other, 1 from Calvinist Church, 1 from Islam and 1 from Ad hoc movements.

== Gallery ==
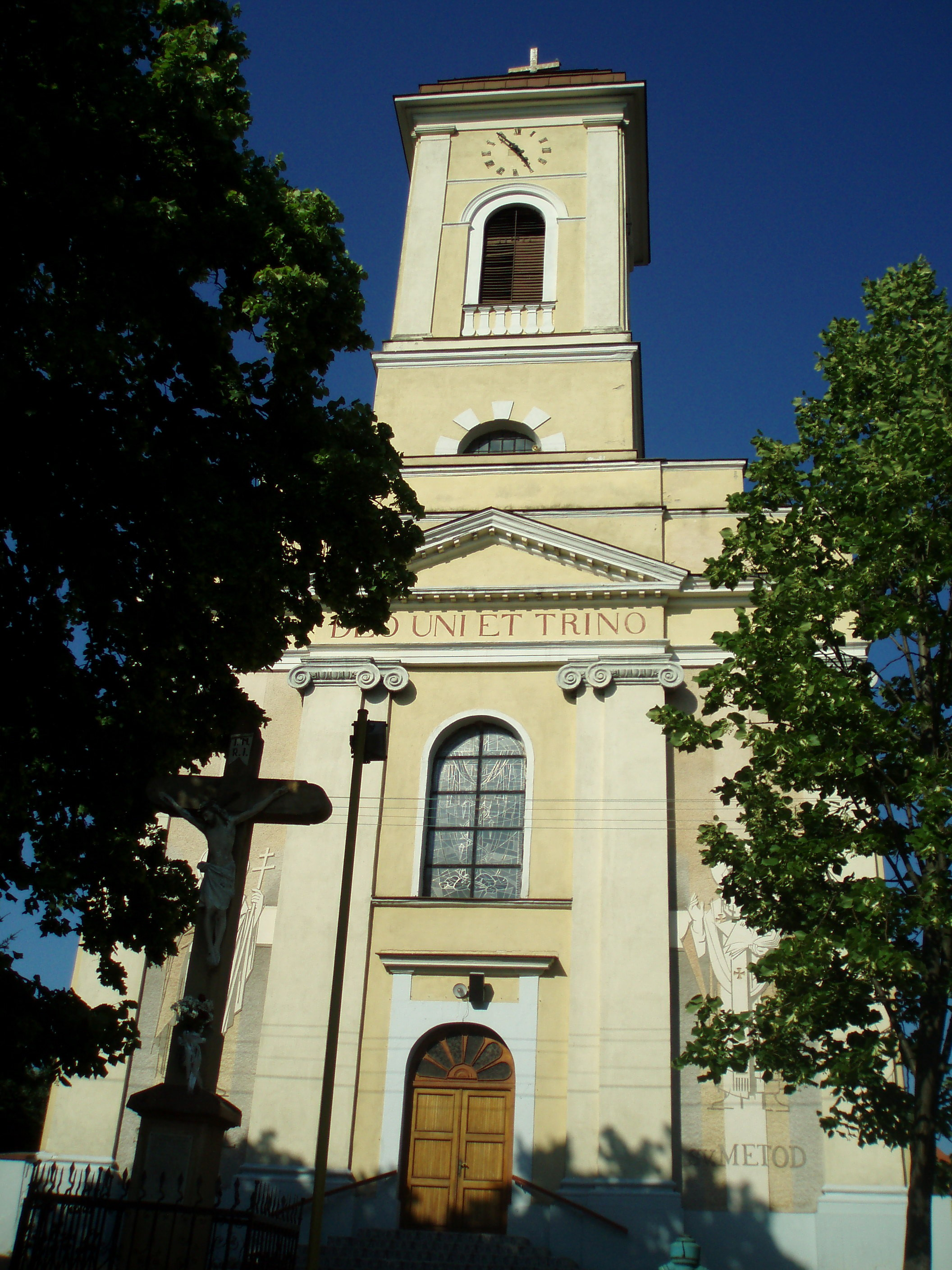
Church of the Assumption of the Virgin Mary, est. 1842 (July 2006)

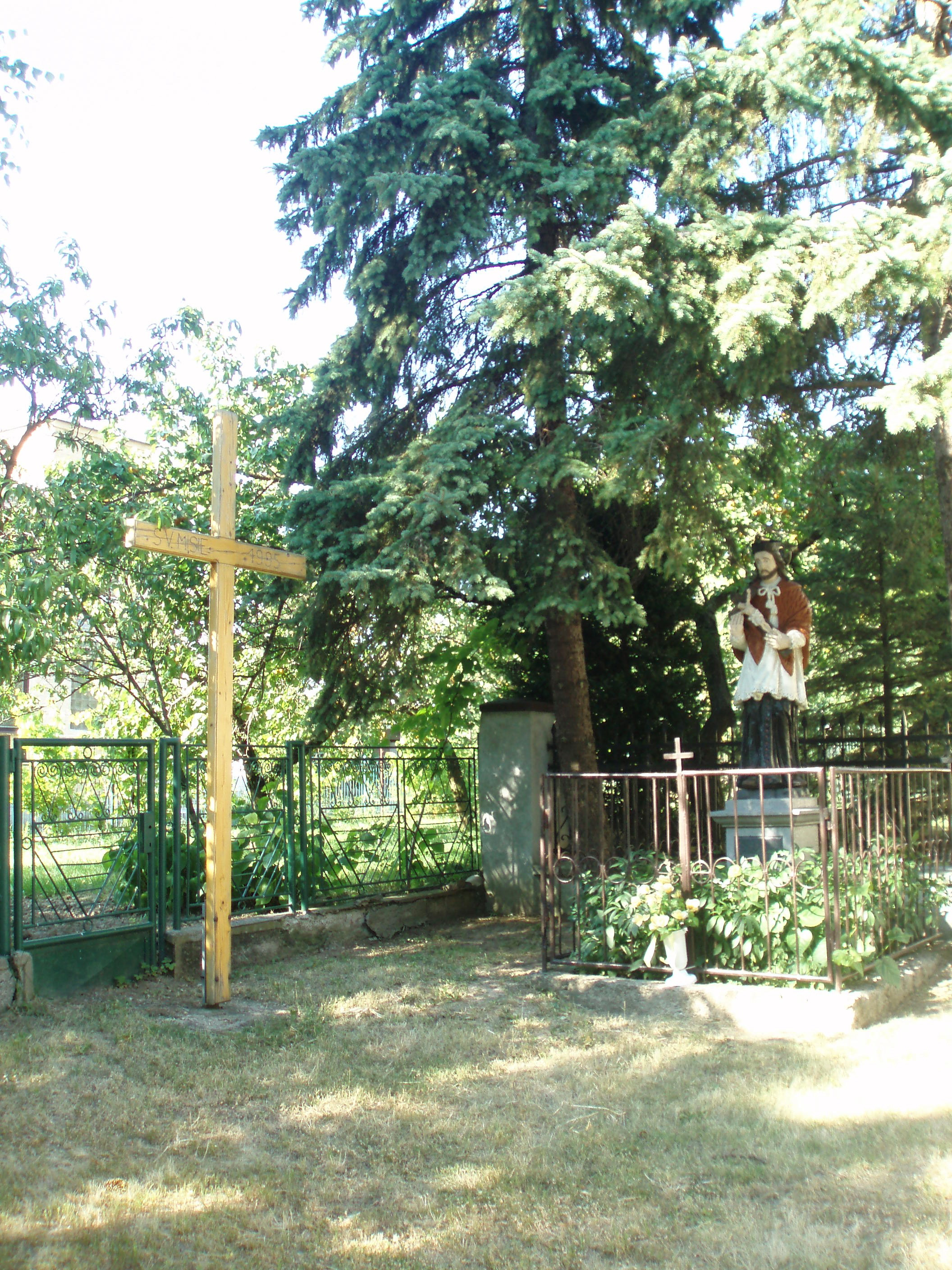
Statue of John of Nepomuk in Staré

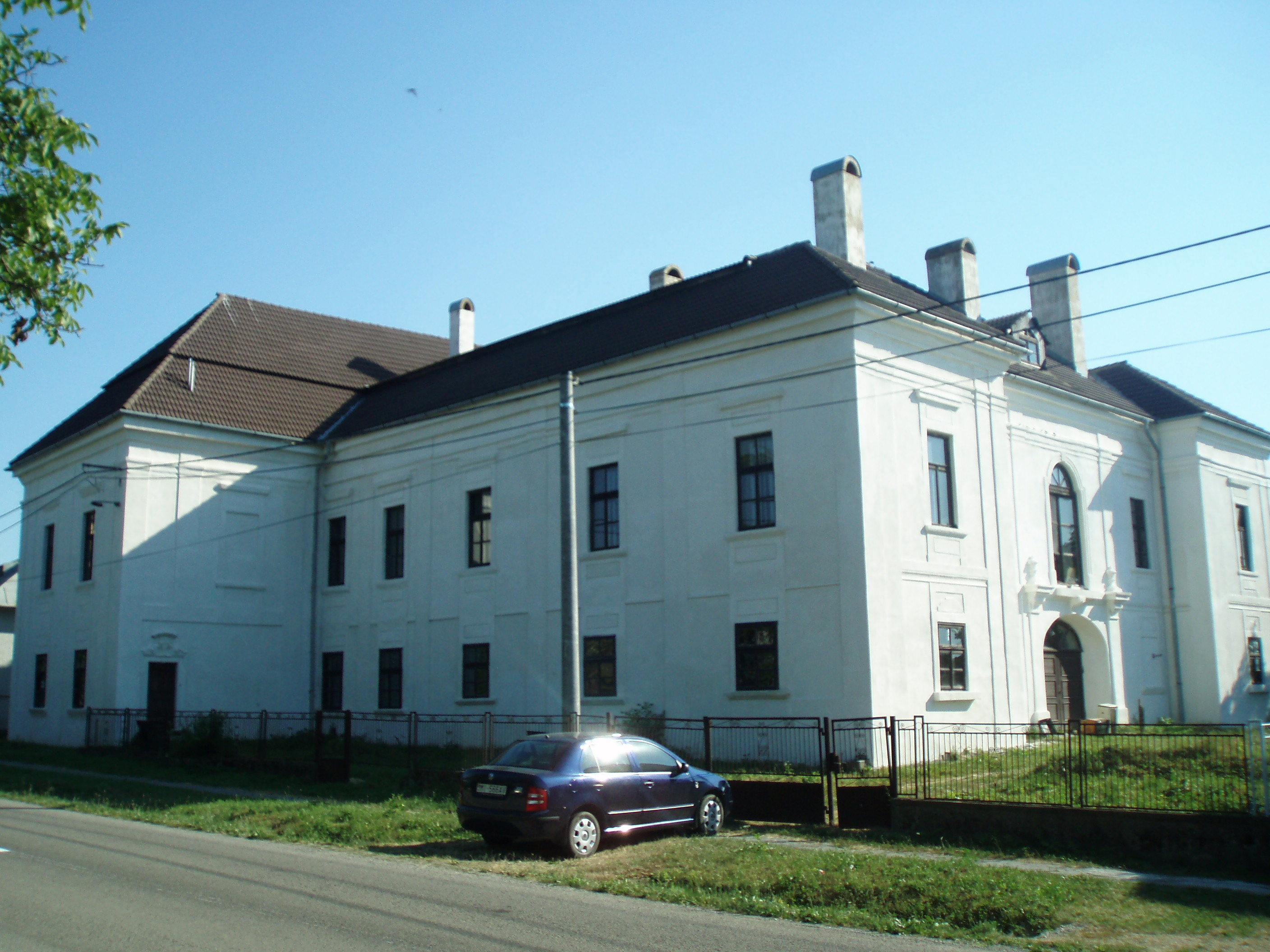
Manor house in Staré, est. early 1600s (July 2006)

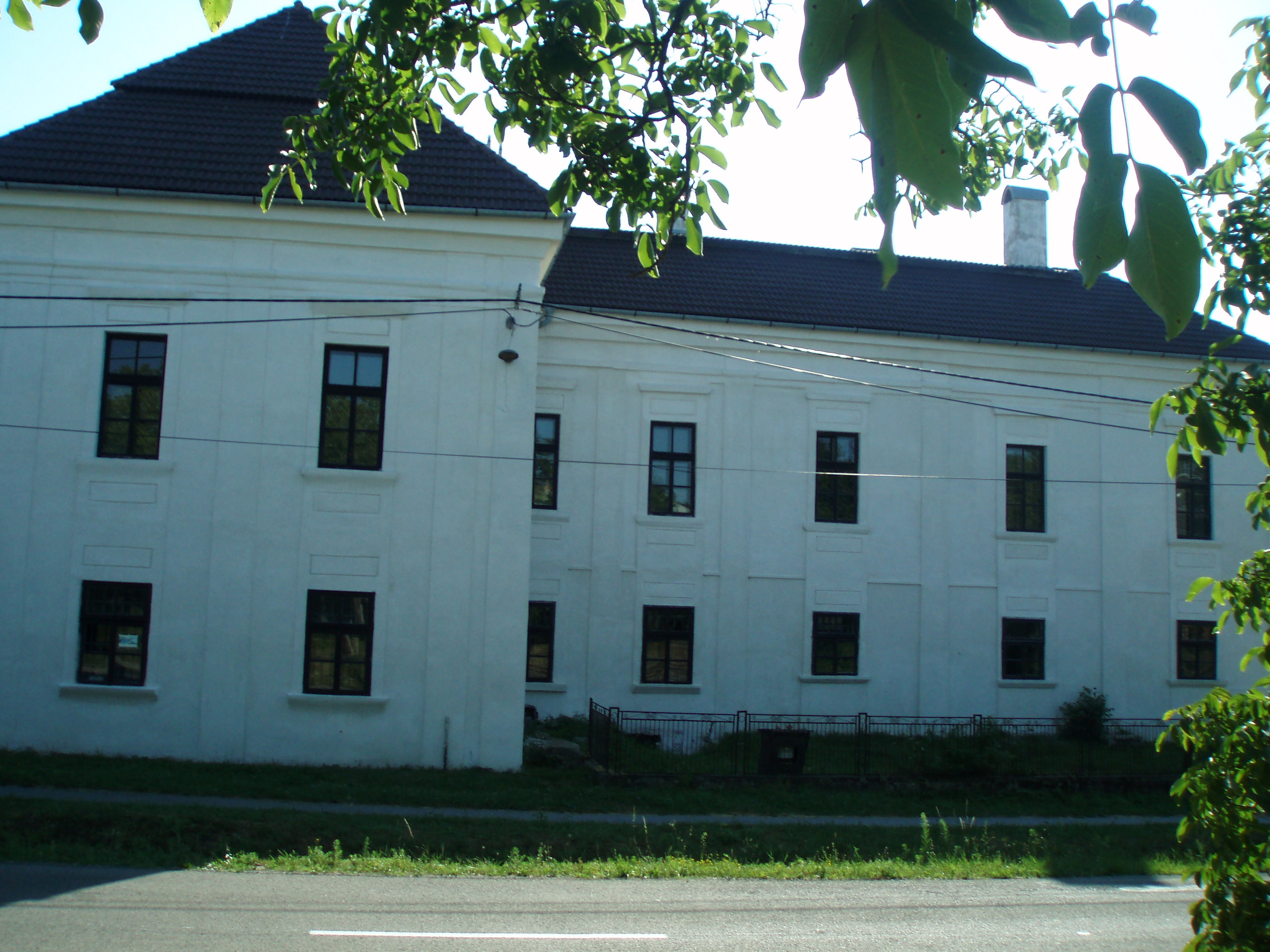
Manor house in Staré, est. early 1600s (July 2006)

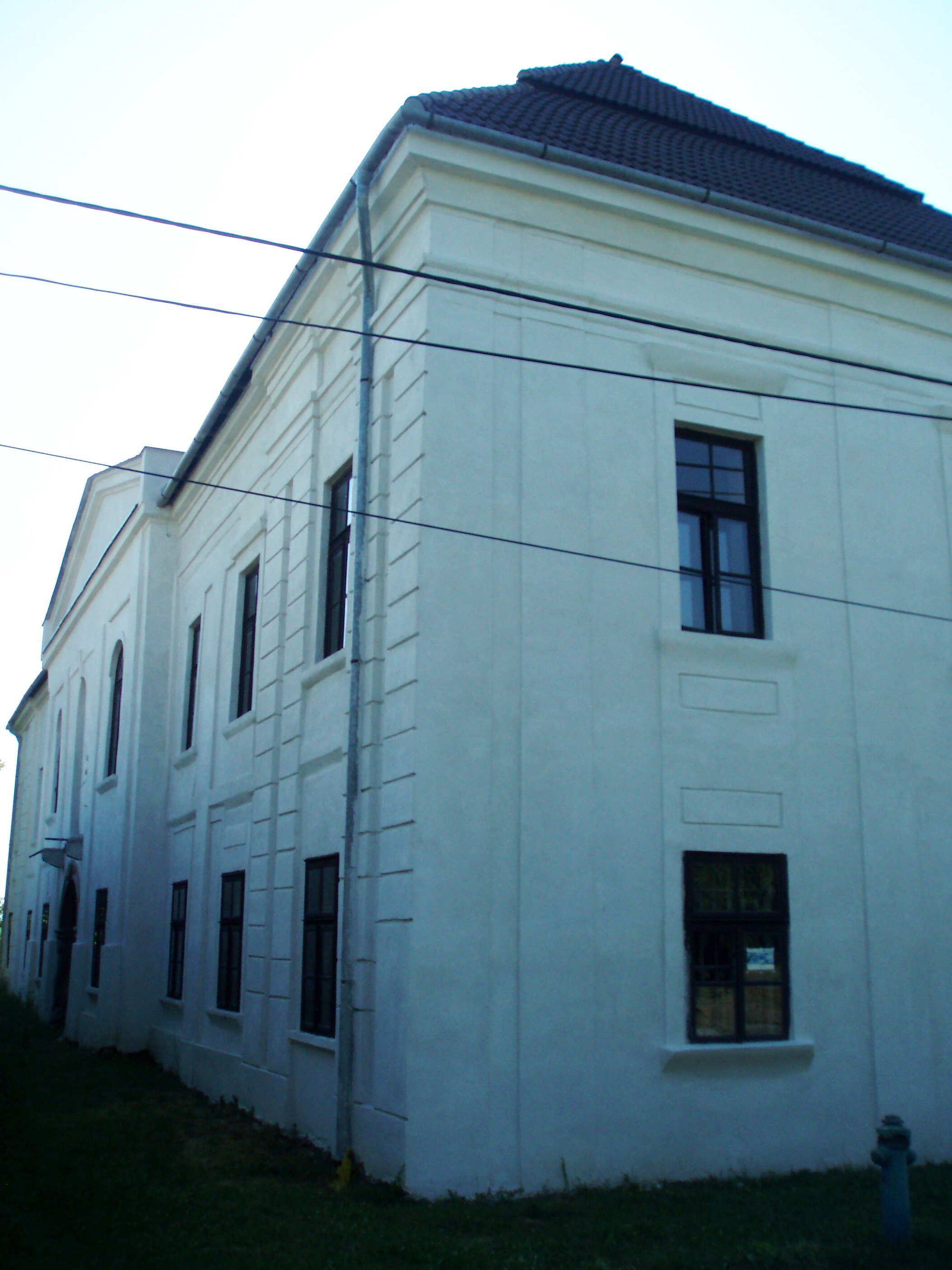
Manor house in Staré, est. early 1600s (July 2006)

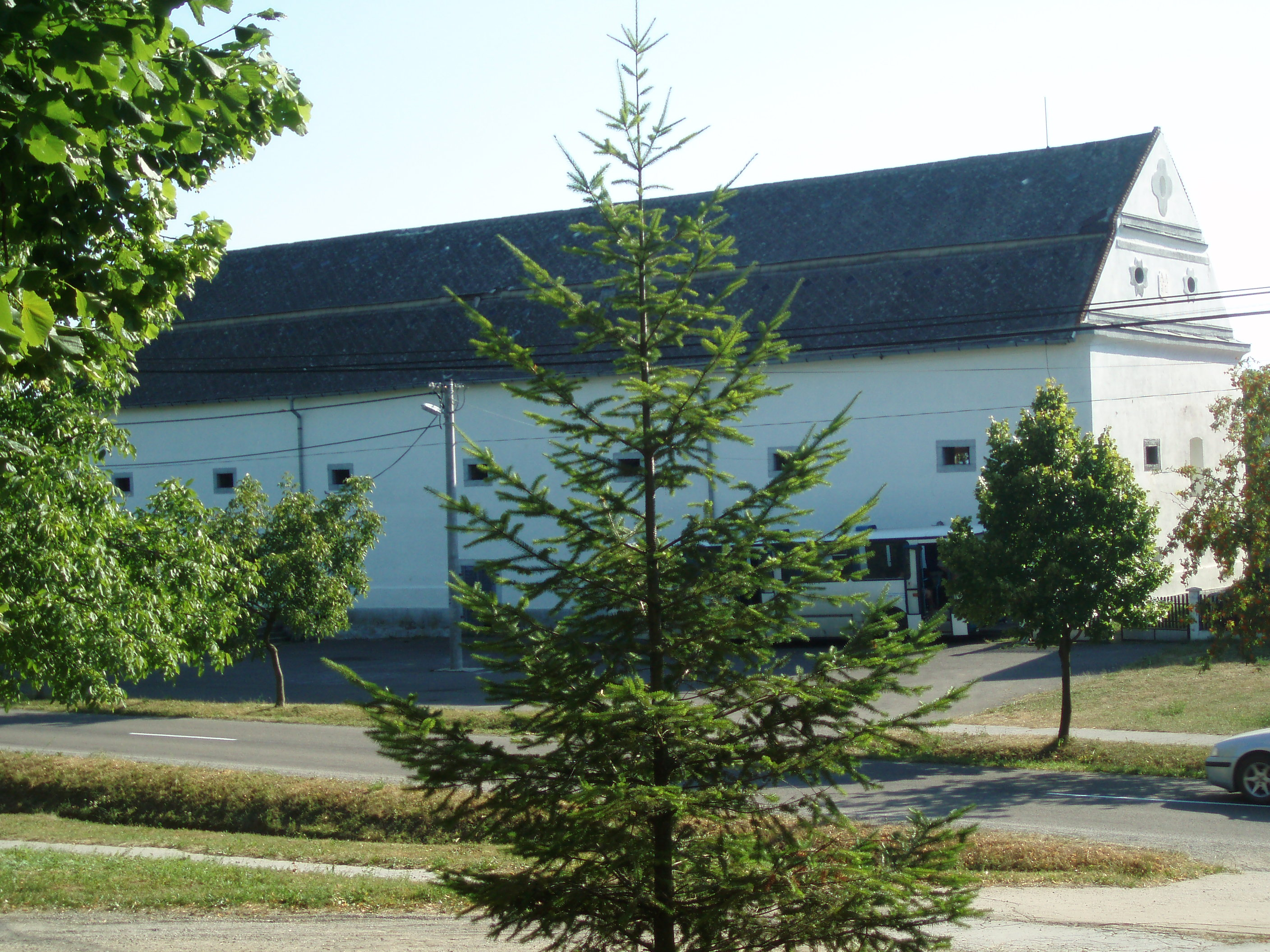
Village granary in Neo-Classical style, est. 1804 (July 2006)

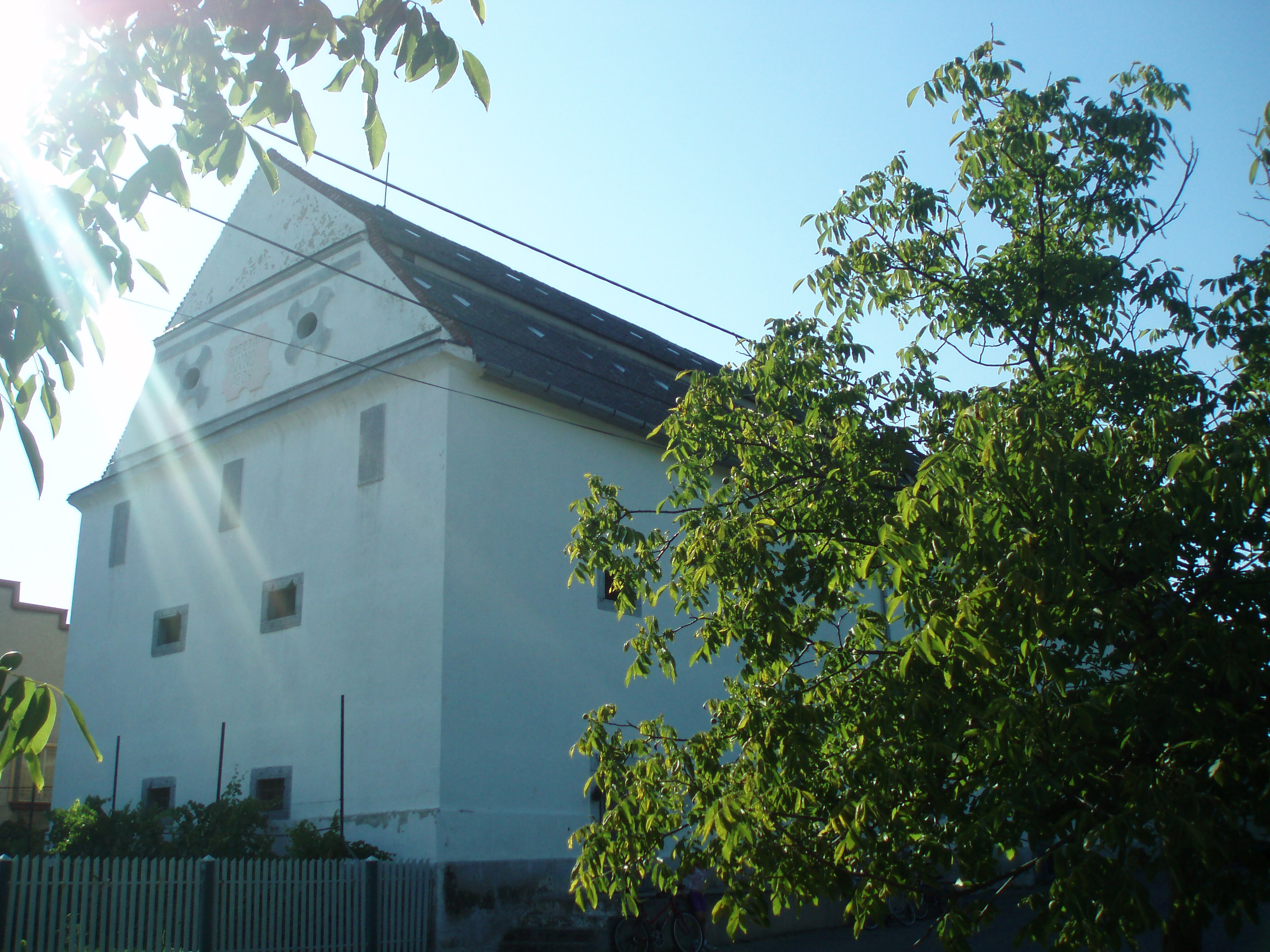
Village granary in Neo-Classical style, est. 1804 (July 2006)

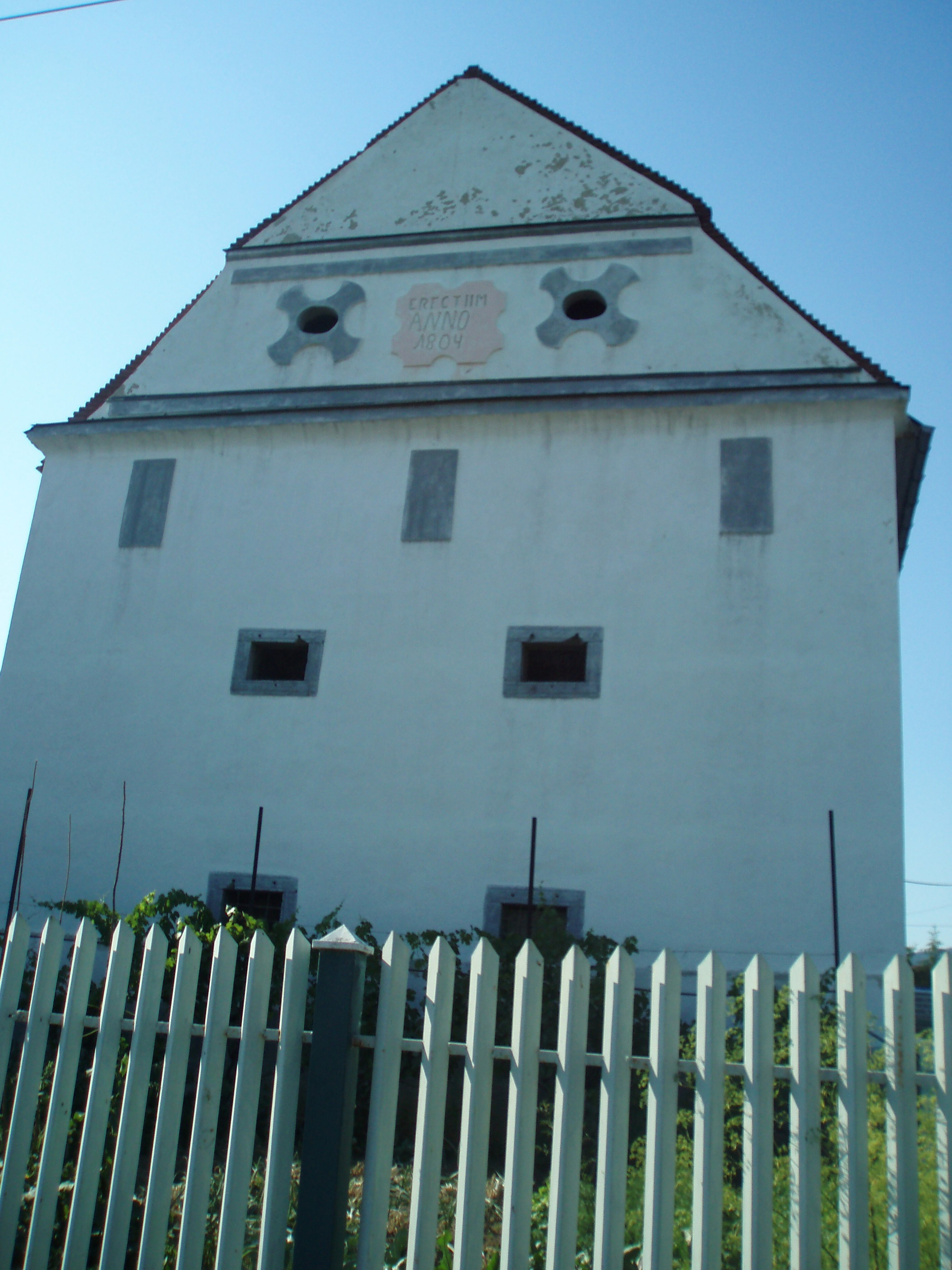
Village granary in Neo-Classical style, est. 1804 (July 2006)
