= Tibava =

Village and municipality in Slovakia

Tibava Tiba
- Municipality
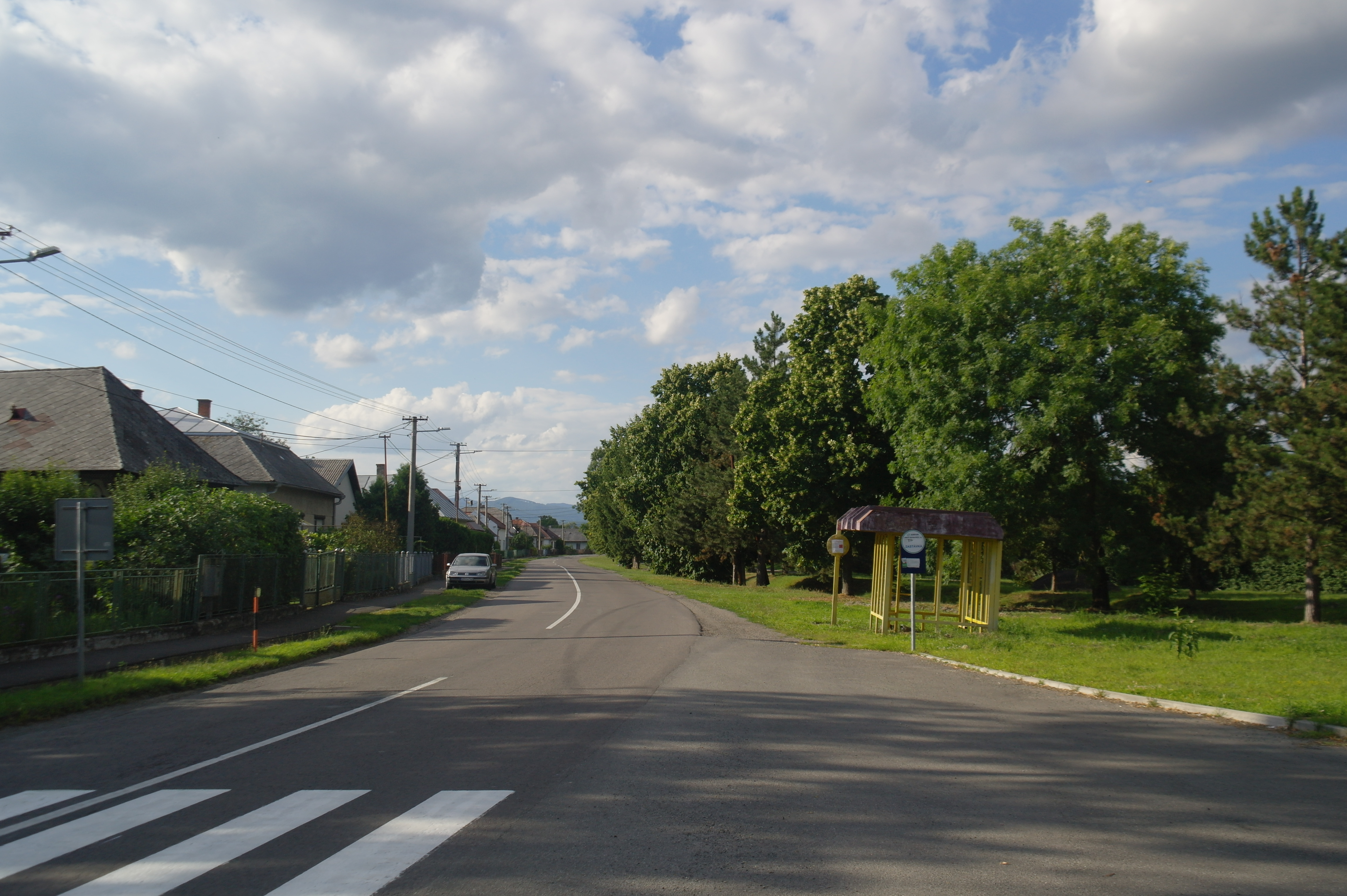

- Flag

- Location of Tibava in the Košice Region Location of Tibava in Slovakia
- Coordinates: 48.75°N 22.23°E
- Country: Slovakia
- Region: Košice Region
- District: Sobrance District
- First mentioned: 1282

Area
  - Total: 10.64 km^{2} (4.11 sq mi)
- Elevation: 130 m (430 ft)

Population (2025)
  - Total: 528
- Time zone: UTC+1 (CET)
  - Summer (DST): UTC+2 (CEST)
- Postal code: 730 1
- Area code: +421 56
- Vehicle registration plate (until 2022): SO
- Website: www.obectibava.sk

Tibava (Hungarian: Tiba; Rusyn: Тібава) is a village and municipality in the Sobrance District in the Košice Region of eastern Slovakia.

== History ==
In historical records the village was first mentioned in 1282.

== Geography ==
The municipality lies at an altitude of 130 metres (430 ft) and covers an area of 10.64 km^{2} (4.11 sq mi) (2025).

== Population ==
Population statistic (10 years)
Year	1995	2005	2015	2025
Count	504	522	563	528
Difference		+3.57%	+7.85%	−6.21%

Population statistic
Year	2024	2025
Count	534	528
Difference		−1.12%

It has a population of 528 people (31 December 2025).

=== Ethnicity ===
Census 2021 (1+%)
Ethnicity	Number	Fraction
Slovak	453	84.51%
Not found out	40	7.46%
Romani	38	7.08%
Total	536	

In year 2021 was 536 people by ethnicity 453 as Slovak, 40 as Not found out, 38 as Romani, 4 as Czech, 4 as Ukrainian, 3 as Polish, 1 as Rusyn and 1 as Austrian.

Note on population: The difference values of population numbers in the table "Population statistic" and in the sections "Ethnicity" & "Religion" is caused by the use of various statistical methods.

=== Religion ===
Census 2021 (1+%)
Religion	Number	Fraction
Roman Catholic Church	300	55.97%
Greek Catholic Church	114	21.27%
Not found out	61	11.38%
None	31	5.78%
Eastern Orthodox Church	11	2.05%
Calvinist Church	7	1.31%
Total	536	

In year 2021 was 536 people by religion 300 from Roman Catholic Church, 114 from Greek Catholic Church, 61 from Not found out, 31 from None, 11 from Eastern Orthodox Church, 7 from Calvinist Church, 5 from Jehovah's Witnesses, 3 from Apostolic Church, 2 from Ad hoc movements, 1 from Old Catholic Church and 1 from Other.

== Facilities ==
The village has a public library, a gymnasium and a soccer pitch.
