= Gelénes =

Coordinates: 48°12′N 22°27′E

- Interactive map of Gelénes
- Country: Hungary
- County: Szabolcs-Szatmár-Bereg

Area
  - Total: 20.55 km^{2} (7.93 sq mi)

Population (2001)
  - Total: 611
  - Density: 29.73/km^{2} (77.0/sq mi)
- Time zone: UTC+1 (CET)
  - Summer (DST): UTC+2 (CEST)
- Postal code: 4935
- Area code: 45

Location of Szabolcs-Szatmar-Bereg county in Hungary

Gelénes is a village in Szabolcs-Szatmár-Bereg county, in the Northern Great Plain region of eastern Hungary.

Jews lived in Gelénes for many years and they had a Jewish cemetery that was apparently moved. During World War II nearly all of the Jews from Gelénes were murdered in the Holocaust.

== Geography ==
It covers an area of 20.55 km^{2} (8 sq mi) and has a population of 611 people (2001).
