= Huba (name) =

Huba is a surname or a given name. Huba was a Hungarian (Magyar) warlord in the 9th century. He was one of the seven chieftains of the Magyars and probably settled in western Hungary, in the region of Győr. Since then, Huba is a traditional Hungarian male given name, but in some cases, it could be a family name too.

Notable people with the name include:

== Given name ==
- Huba Rozsnyai (1942–2020), Hungarian sprinter
- Huba Wass de Czege (born 1941), United States Army general

== Surname ==
- Martin Huba (born 1943), Slovak actor and director
- Nataliya Huba (born 1978), Ukrainian rower
- Peter Huba (born 1986), Slovak ice hockey player
- Volodymyr Huba (1938–2020), Ukrainian composer and poet

== See also ==
- Huban (name)
