= Nádasdy Mausoleum =

1664 portrait series of Hungarian leaders

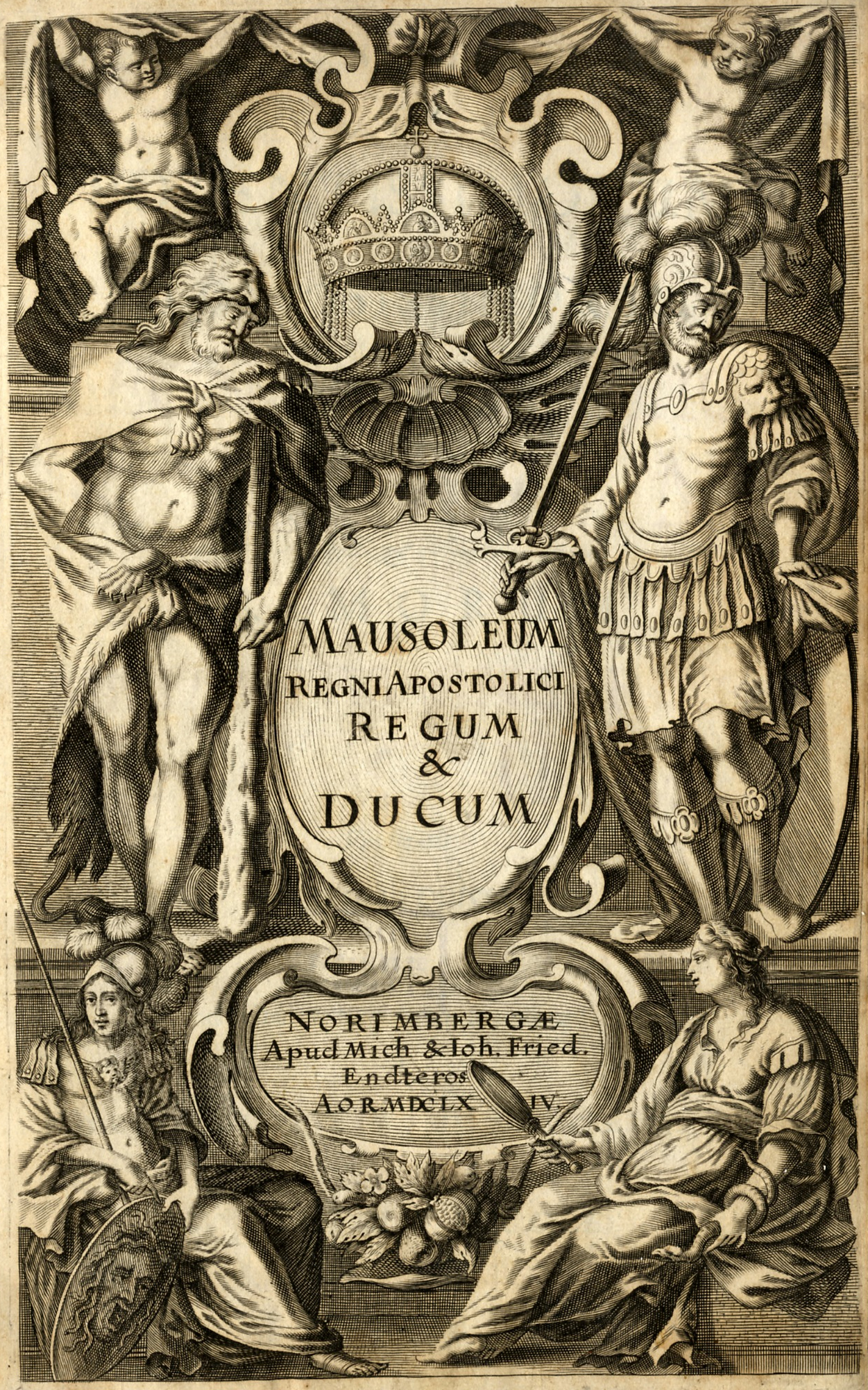
The title page of the Nádasdy Mausoleum

The Nádasdy Mausoleum is a series of full-length portraits of Hun and Hungarian leaders and kings published in Nuremberg in 1664 at the expense of Count Ferenc Nádasdy under the title: Mausoleum potentissimorum ac gloriosissimorum Regni Apostolici Regum et primorum militantis Ungariae Ducum (The Mausoleum of the Most Powerful and Glorious Apostolic Kingdom and the Kings and Military Leaders of Hungary). The depictions of the Hungarian kings are complemented by descriptions in Latin and German.

Count Ferenc Nádasdy (1625–1671) was the lord-lieutenant of counties of Vas, Zala and Sopron, and lord chief justice of the Kingdom of Hungary between 1655–1670. He was one of the country's richest and most educated lords, a patron of science and art, his name is associated with the publication of this series of engravings.

== The chronicle ==
The engravings are followed by Latin eulogies about the depicted person, followed by a relatively faithful, but in some cases very mannered German translation.

== Illustrations ==
The chronicle including with the title page contains 60 full-page images made with mixed techniques (engraving and etching). The images are listed in the same order as their appearance in the chronicle.

Illustration	Description
Keve, 1st Prince of Hungary Keve, 1st Prince of the Huns	Captain Keve of the Huns.
Kadicsa, 2nd Prince of Hungary Kadicsa, 2nd Prince of the Huns	
Keme, 3rd Prince of Hungary Keme, the 3rd Prince of the Huns, Military Judge	
Béla, 4th Prince of Hungary Béla, 4th Prince of the Huns, Defeated the Romans, Prince Macrinus, Leader of Pannonia	
Buda, 5th Prince of Hungary Buda, 5th Prince of the Huns	Buda, brother of Attila.
Attila, King of Hungary Attila, King of the Huns, Medes, Dacians, the Fear of the World, the Scourge of God	King Attila of the Hunnic Empire.
Árpád, 7th Prince of Hungary Árpád, 1st Captain of Hungary	Árpád, Grand Prince of the Hungarians.
Szabolcs, 8th Prince of Hungary Szabolcs, 2nd Captain of Hungary	Szabolcs, Hungarian chieftain from the seven chieftains of the Hungarians.
Gyula, 9th Prince of Hungary Gyula, 3rd Captain of Hungary	Gyula, Hungarian chieftain from the seven chieftains of the Hungarians.
Kund, 10th Prince of Hungary Kund, 4th Captain of Hungary	Kund, Hungarian chieftain from the seven chieftains of the Hungarians.
Lehel, 11th Prince of Hungary Lehel, 5th Captain of Hungary	Lehel, Hungarian chieftain from the seven chieftains of the Hungarians.
Vérbulcsú, 12th Prince of Hungary Vérbulcsú, 6th Captain of Hungary	Vérbulcsú, Hungarian chieftain from the seven chieftains of the Hungarians.
Örs, 13th Prince of Hungary Örs, 7th Captain of Hungary	Örs, Hungarian chieftain from the seven chieftains of the Hungarians.
Géza, Prince of Hungarian Christians Géza, 1st Prince of the Christian Hungary	Grand Prince Géza of Hungary.
Saint Stephen, 1st Christian King of Hungary Saint Stephen, Apostle and 1st King of Hungary	King Saint Stephen of Hungary and his son Prince Saint Emeric of Hungary.
Peter, 2nd King of Hungary Peter, 2nd King of Hungary	King Peter of Hungary.
Aba, 3rd King of Hungary Aba, 3rd King of Hungary	King Samuel Aba of Hungary.
Andrew, 4th King of Hungary Andrew I, 4th King of Hungary	King Andrew I of Hungary.
Béla, 5th King of Hungary Béla I, 5th King of Hungary	King Béla I of Hungary.
Solomon, 6th King of Hungary Solomon, 6th King of Hungary	King Solomon of Hungary.
Géza, 7th King of Hungary Géza I, 7th King of Hungary	King Géza I of Hungary.
Saint Ladislaus, 8th King of Hungary Saint Ladislaus I, 8th King of Hungary	King Saint Ladislaus of Hungary.
Coloman, 9th King of Hungary Coloman, 9th King of Hungary	King Coloman of Hungary.
Stephen II, 10th King of Hungary Stephen II, 10th King of Hungary	King Stephen II of Hungary.
Béla II, 11th King of Hungary Béla II the Blind, 11th King of Hungary	King Béla II of Hungary.
Géza II, 12th King of Hungary Géza II, 12th King of Hungary	King Géza II of Hungary.
Stephen III, 13th King of Hungary Stephen III, 13th King of Hungary	King Stephen III of Hungary.
Ladislaus II, 14th King of Hungary Ladislaus II, 14th King of Hungary	King Ladislaus II of Hungary.
Stephen IV, 15th King of Hungary Stephen IV, 15th King of Hungary	King Stephen IV of Hungary.
Béla III, 16th King of Hungary Béla III, 16th King of Hungary	King Béla III of Hungary.
Emeric, 17th King of Hungary Emeric, 17th King of Hungary	King Emeric of Hungary.
Ladislaus III, 18th King of Hungary Ladislaus III, 18th King of Hungary	King Ladislaus III of Hungary.
Andrew II, 19th King of Hungary Andrew II, 19th King of Hungary	King Andrew II of Hungary.
Béla IV, 20th King of Hungary Béla IV, 20th King of Hungary	King Béla IV of Hungary.
Stephen V, 21st King of Hungary Stephen V, 21st King of Hungary	King Stephen V of Hungary.
Ladislaus IV, 22nd King of Hungary Ladislaus IV, 22nd King of Hungary	King Ladislaus IV of Hungary.
Andrew III, 23rd King of Hungary Andrew III the Venetian, 23rd King of Hungary	King Andrew III of Hungary.
Wenceslaus, 24th King of Hungary Wenceslaus, 24th King of Hungary	King Wenceslaus of Hungary.
Otto, 25th King of Hungary Otto the Bavarian, 25th King of Hungary	King Otto of Hungary.
Charles I, 26th King of Hungary Charles I, 26th King of Hungary	King Charles I of Hungary.
Louis I, 27th King of Hungary Louis I, 27th King of Hungary	King Louis I of Hungary.
Mary, 28th King of Hungary Mary, 28th King of Hungary	Queen Mary of Hungary.
Charles II, 29th King of Hungary Charles II the Short, 29th King of Hungary	King Charles II of Hungary.
Sigismund, 30th King of Hungary Sigismund the Emperor, 30th King of Hungary	King Sigismund of Hungary.
Albert, 31st King of Hungary Albert the Emperor, 31st King of Hungary	King Albert of Hungary.
Ladislaus V, 32nd King of Hungary Ladislaus V the Posthumous, 32nd King of Hungary	King Ladislaus V of Hungary.
Vladislaus I, 33rd King of Hungary Vladislaus I the Polish, 33rd King of Hungary	King Vladislaus I of Hungary.
John Hunyadi, Governor of Hungary John Hunyadi, Governor of Hungary	Regent-Governor John Hunyadi of Hungary.
Matthias Corvinus, 34th King of Hungary Matthias I Corvinus, 34th King of Hungary	King Matthias I of Hungary.
Vladislaus II, 35th King of Hungary Vladislaus II, 35th King of Hungary	King Vladislaus II of Hungary.
Louis II, 36th King of Hungary Louis II, 36th King of Hungary	King Louis II of Hungary.
John Zápolya, 37th King of Hungary John Zápolya, 37th King of Hungary	King John I of Hungary.
Ferdinand I, 38th King of Hungary Ferdinand I, 38th King of Hungary	King Ferdinand I of Hungary.
Maximilian, 39th King of Hungary Maximilian, 39th King of Hungary	King Maximilian of Hungary.
Rudolph, 40th King of Hungary Rudolph, 40th King of Hungary	King Rudolph of Hungary.
Matthias II, 41st King of Hungary Matthias II, 41st King of Hungary	King Matthias II of Hungary.
Ferdinand II, 42nd King of Hungary Ferdinand II, 42nd King of Hungary	King Ferdinand II of Hungary.
Ferdinand III, 43rd King of Hungary Ferdinand III, 43rd King of Hungary	King Ferdinand III of Hungary.
Ferdinand IV, 44th King of Hungary Ferdinand IV, 44th King of Hungary	King Ferdinand IV of Hungary.

== See also ==
- List of Hungarian chronicles
- Gesta Hungarorum
- Gesta Hunnorum et Hungarorum
- Chronicon Pictum
- Buda Chronicle
- Chronica Hungarorum
- Epitome rerum Hungarorum
