= Huban =

Huban is a name. Some notable bearers of the name include the following:

== First name ==
- Huban A. Gowadia (born 1969), transportation engineer and government official

== Surname ==
- Eileen Huban (1890s–1935), Irish actress in New York City
- Peter Huban (born 1976), Irish hurler

== Other uses ==
- Tahish al-Huban (1973), a short-story collection by Zayd Mutee' Dammaj; also the title of one of the short stories in the collection

== See also ==
- Huba (name)
- Huband
- Hoban
