= Hoobin =

Hoobin is an Irish surname. Notable people with the surname include:

- Henry Hoobin (1879–1921), Canadian lacrosse player
- Jack Hoobin (1927–2000), Australian cyclist
- Pamela Hoobin, Australian politician

== See also ==
- Hoban (surname)
