= Huband =

Huband is a surname. Notable people with the surname include:

- Charles Huband, Manitoban politician
- Debbie Huband (born 1956), Canadian basketball player
- John Huband (disambiguation), multiple people

== Other ==
- Huband (HBC vessel), operated by the HBC in 1687, see Hudson's Bay Company vessels

== See also ==
- Huban (name)
