= Hobița =

Hobiţa may refer to several villages in Romania:

- Hobiţa, a village in Peștișani Commune, Gorj County
- Hobiţa, a village in Pui Commune, Hunedoara County

== See also ==
- Hoban (surname)
