= Hoban =

Hoban is a surname. Notable people with the surname include:

- Barry Hoban (1940–2025), British cyclist
- Edward Francis Hoban (1878–1966), American Catholic bishop of Rockford and Cleveland

- Archbishop Hoban High School, Catholic school in Akron, Ohio, named for him

- James Hoban (1758–1831), Irish-born American architect who designed the White House in Washington, D.C.
- James Hoban, Jr. (1808–1846), United States Attorney for the District of Columbia and son of the above
- Jeanne Hoban (1924–1997), British political activist
- Jerry Hoban (1954-2015), American actor and impersonator, best known for portraying an Ed Sullivan impersonator in Pulp Fiction and for Beatles tribute band The Fab Four
- Julia Hoban, American writer of children's books
- Lillian Hoban (1925–1998), American writer and artist
- Mark Hoban (born 1964), British politician
- Ovidiu Hoban (born 1982), Romanian footballer
- Patricia Hoban (born 1932), Australian basketball player
- Patrick Hoban (born 1991), Irish footballer
- Phoebe Hoban, American journalist
- Russell Hoban (1925–2011), American writer
- Samuel John Hoban (1865–1931), Australian Methodist minister
- Walter Hoban (1890–1939), American cartoonist known for Jerry on the Job

As a given name

- Hoban Washburne, fictional character in the television series Firefly

== See also ==
- Hobița (disambiguation)
- Hoobin (disambiguation)
