= Hungarorum =

Hungarorum may refer to:

- Chronica Hungarorum is the title of several works treating the early Hungarian history
- Constanti Hungarorum is an 1893 encyclical of Pope Leo XIII on the Church in Hungary.
- Gesta Hungarorum is a record of early Hungarian history.
- The Gesta Hunnorum et Hungarorum is one of the sources of early Hungarian history.
