= Lehel =

Magyar chieftain (died 955)

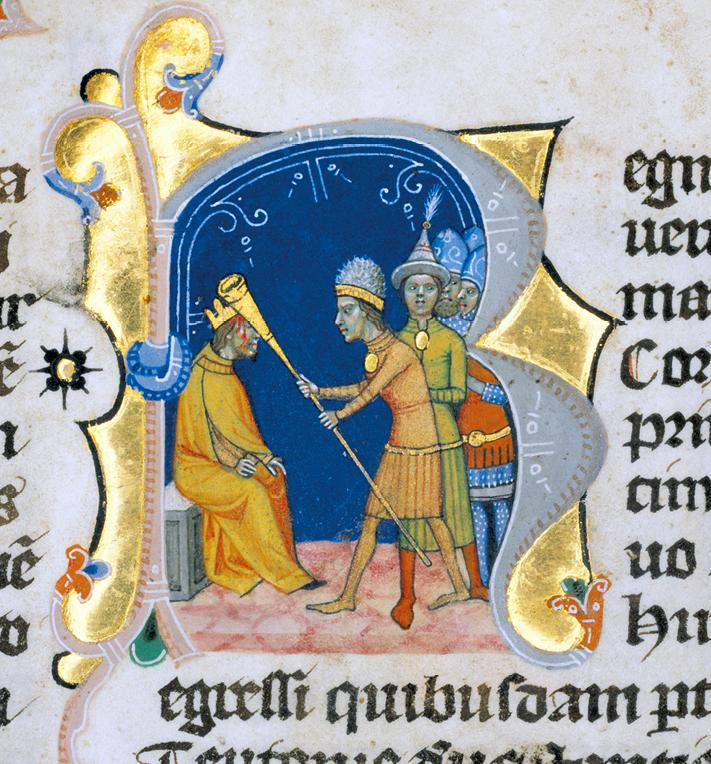
- Lehel is killing his captor (Chronicon Pictum 1358)
- Died: 15 August 955; Regensburg, Duchy of Bavaria
- Noble family: Árpád dynasty
- Father: Tas

Lehel (Hungarian: Lehel or Lél; died 955), a member of the Árpád dynasty, was a Magyar chieftain and, together with Bulcsú, one of the most important figures of the Hungarian invasions of Europe. After the Magyar defeat at the Battle of Lechfeld, he was executed in Regensburg.

== Origin ==
The medieval chronicler Anonymus calls Lehel the son of Tas, who was one of the "seven chieftains of the Magyars", and a descendant of late Grand Prince Árpád. Most historians agree that there is a mismatch in the timing, though he should be the son of Tas, who is mentioned as a grandson of Árpád by Emperor Constantine VII.

Lehel's dukedom from about 925 was the Principality of Nitra, where he ruled in the former Kabarian lands. The historic cities of Alsólelóc and Felsőlelóc (in present-day Slovakia) kept the name of Lél. His dukedom could also refer to the status of Lél being a crown-prince and duke-to-be.

== Battle of Lechfeld ==
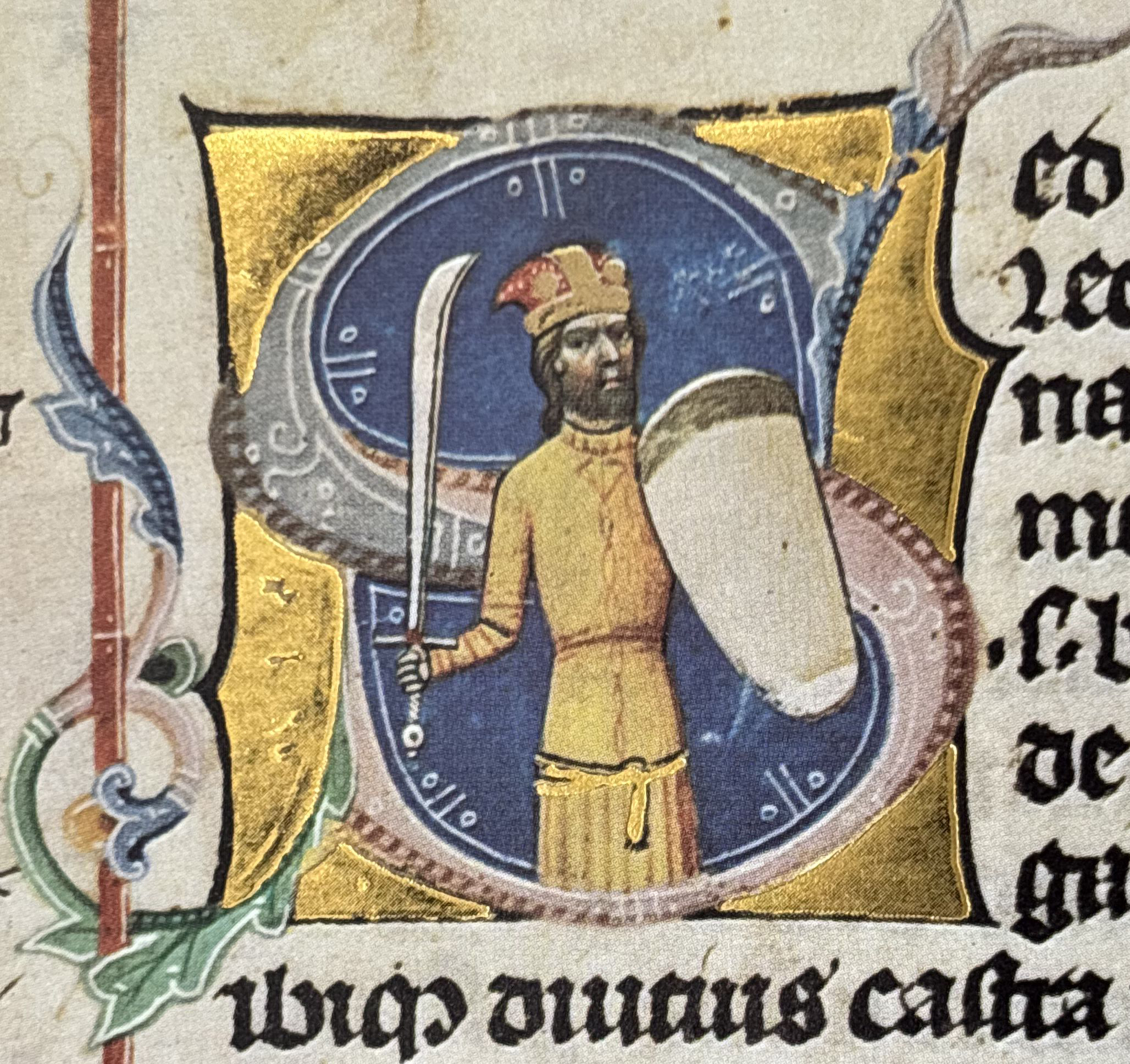
Lehel, one of the seven chieftains of the Hungarians (Illuminated Chronicle)

In the military conflict with East Francia, Lehel, together with Bulcsú and Súr, led the Magyar forces under Grand Prince Zoltán into the Battle of Riade in 933. When, in Spring of 954, the Magyars again attacked the Duchy of Bavaria, Lehel also led the Nitrian Kabars. The Hungarian troops advanced up to Lotharingia, where they signed an armistice with the Salian prince Conrad the Red and fought against his rival Duke Bruno the Great. The next year, they met with the united East Frankish forces under King Otto I at the Battle of Lechfeld near Augsburg.

The battle ended with the decisive defeat of the Hungarians. According to the Annales Sangallenses maiores, the three Hungarian military leaders were captured by Bohemian troopers. With Bulcsú and Súr, Lehel was arrested, handed over to King Otto's brother, Duke Henry of Bavaria, and hanged at his residence in Regensburg. By his victory, Otto put an end to the Hungarian invasions; he was crowned Holy Roman Emperor in 962.

== Lehel's Horn myth ==
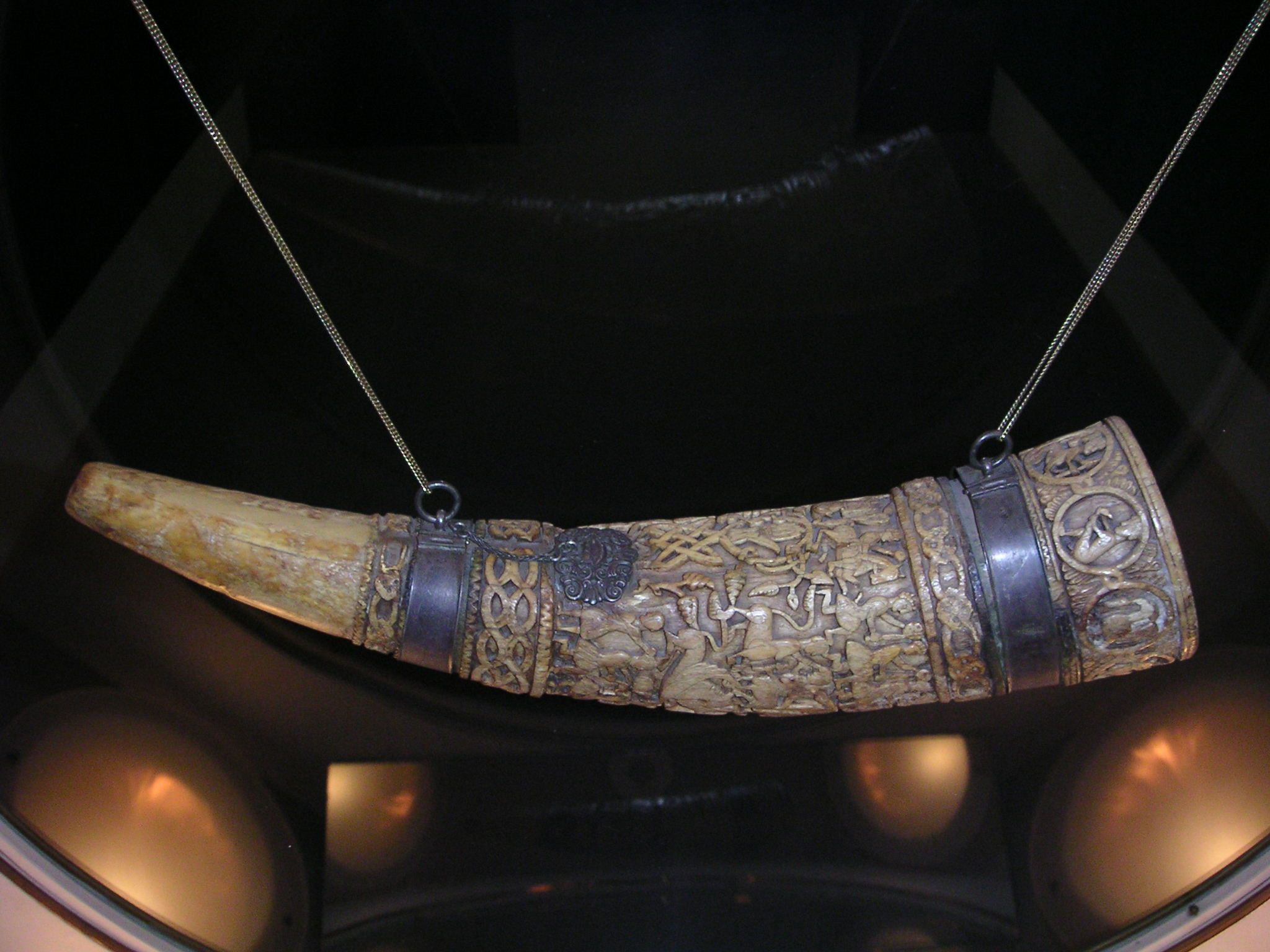
The horn of Lehel, kept in Jászberény

The 14th-century Chronicon Pictum, written in Latin by Marci de Kalt, tried to picture Lehel as a Hungarian hero who was defiant even in captivity:

In 955, (...) the Hungarians reached the city of Augsburg. Close to the city, at the Lech field, the Germans smashed the Hungarians, part of them were killed brutally, some others were imprisoned. At that place Lehel and Bulcsú were also imprisoned, and taken in front of the emperor. When the emperor asked, why the Hungarians are so cruel against the Christians, they replied, "We are the revenge of the highest God, sent to you as a scourge. You shall imprison us and kill us, when we cease to chase you." Then the emperor called them: "Choose the type of death you wish". Then Lehel replied, "Bring me my horn, which I will blow, then I will reply". The horn was handed to him, and during the preparation to blow it, he stepped forward, and hit the emperor so strongly he died instantly. Then he said: "You will walk before me and serve me in the other world", as it is a common belief within the Scythians, that whoever they killed in their lives will serve them in the other world. They were taken to custody and were hanged quickly in Regensburg.

This fiction cleverly re-interpreted the fact that Duke Henry of Bavaria died shortly after the battle of disease, in Lehel's favour. It may also refer to Lehel's former ally Conrad the Red, who, according to Widukind of Corvey, was killed in the battle, when an arrow pierced his throat.

The legend, which initially spread through oral tradition by the regős story tellers, was already rendered in the 13th-century chronicles by Magister Ákos and then depicted in the Chronicon Pictum, compiled about 1360 under the rule of King Louis the Great. Nowadays there is a horn described as "Lehel's Horn" on display at Jászberény, in the Museum of Jász. This is a Byzantine ivory horn from the 10th to 11th centuries.

Already the 13th-century chronicler Simon of Kéza (Ákos' near-contemporary) remained skeptical about the reliability of the legend; "Of course this is quite implausible, and anyone believing such a tale would be making an exhibition of his credulity. After all, felons are normally brought before princes with their hands bound".
