= Julia Hoban =

American writer

Julia Claricia Hoban is an American author of children's books. Her notable books include Willow and Acting Normal.

Willow explores the survivor guilt of a sixteen-year-old girl whose parents died in a car crash where she was driving. Despite the fact her parents knew she didn't have her license and the weather conditions caused the accident, she feels as if the accident was her fault and that she shouldn't have survived, resulting in her participating in self-harm.

She states that she wanted to write a book for people with self-destructive urges and help them to question their own damaging behaviors. She specifically chose to make Willow a cutter because "it is a very dramatic and obvious form of self injury," but argues that she could have used other, less obvious, methods of self-harm. She has also said that Steven Levenkron's Cutting was an influence on the book. The book was a Florida Teens Read Nominee in 2010.
