= Huba (chieftain) =

Huba was one of the 7 ancient Hungarian leaders

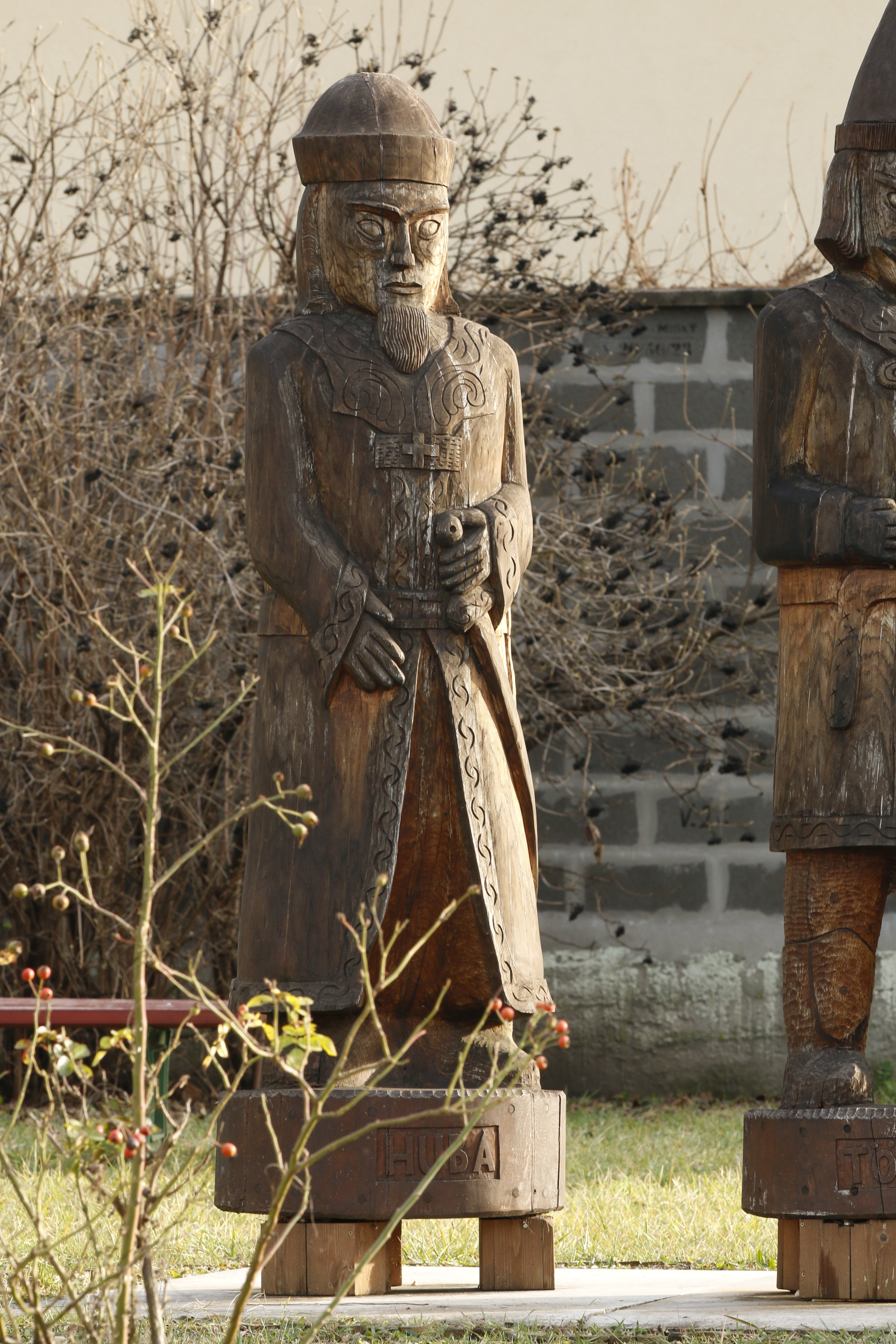
Wooden sculpture of Huba by István Darázs

Huba was a Hungarian tribal leader in the late 9th century. According to Anonymus, author of the early 13th-century Gesta Hungarorum, Huba was one of the seven chieftains (princes) of the conquering Hungarians. This is uncertain, and he may have lived later in the 10th century. He ruled the southern part of the Little Hungarian Plain, but as with the other chieftains, it is not known which tribe he was chief of.

== Interpretations ==
He resided on the Zsitva-Danube-Rába-Marcal-Répce line, his winter quarters being northeast of Komárom on the Zsitva and his summer quarters on the Marcal and the Répce. Near Komáromszemere there was once the village of Hoba, which bore his name. The head of the clan under him may have been Ketel and his son Alaptolma, the ancestors of the Katapán clan, on whose territory Komárom county was established, which included the winter quarters of the chieftain. Huba's Stephen I of Hungary-era descendant, Szemere and the Szemere clan held this area until modern times.

At the time of Koppány's pagan rebellion, Huba's descendants may still have represented a significant force near the river Rába, it was probably on their warning that Stephen I of Hungary nailed one quarter of the quartered Koppány to the gate of the city of Győr.

== Anonymous about Huba ==
According to Anonymus in his Gesta Hungarorum, Huba is the ancestor of the Szemere clan, and was sent by Árpád, the Hungarian prince, (together with Szoárd and Kadocsa) to conquer upper mountains.

"At the same time, Árpád, ... sent many soldiers to conquer the people of the castles of Gömör and Nógrád, and if fortune favoured them, to go up to the border of the Czechs as far as the castle of Nyitra. He appointed as heads and commanders of these soldiers, two sons of his uncle Hülek, Szovárd and Kadász, and then Huba, one of the princes."

Their unfamiliar weapon, the arrow, and their unusual fighting style soon drove back the resisting Slavic troops of the leader Zobor, who were pinned down in the castle of Nyitra. The castle was soon captured and leader Zobor was hanged on the hill later named after him. Then they subdued the whole region and carried the defeated prisoners captive to Árpád, who generously released them.

"In his joy, Árpád made Huba the lord of Nyitra and other castles, and gave him land of his own as far as the Törzsök Forest on the river Zsitva."

== His memory ==
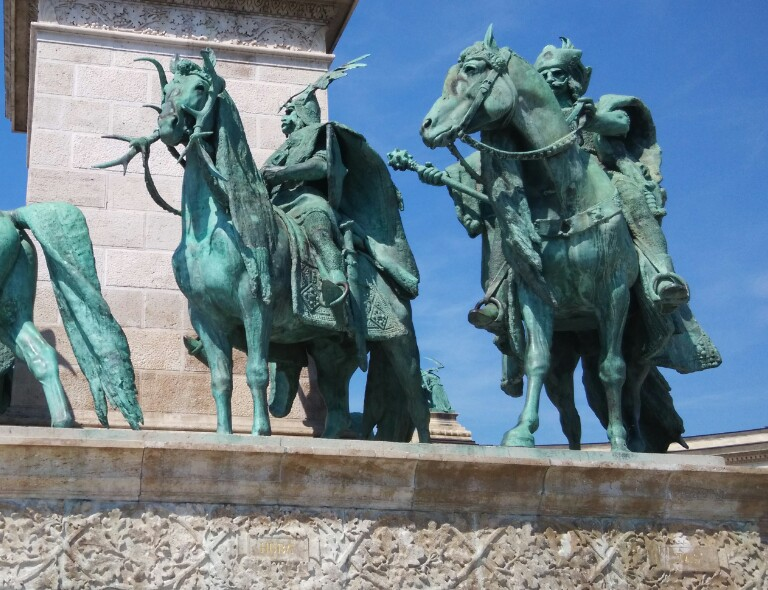
Chieftains Huba (left) and Tas, depicted at the memorial column of the Millennium Monument on Heroes' Square

- The 4.7-metre high bronze equestrian statue of Huba the leader, sculpted by György Zala and erected in 1929, is the central figure of the right arch of the Millennium Monument.
- On Zobor Hill, a millennium monument was built in 1896 in memory of the leader Huba, in white granite, with four birds of the market. The 20-metre-high memorial column was inaugurated on 30 August 1896, but was pulled down by Czech troops on 9 February 1921. Today, only the cylindrical pedestal remains.
