= Seven chieftains of the Magyars =

Hungarian tribal leaders in 895

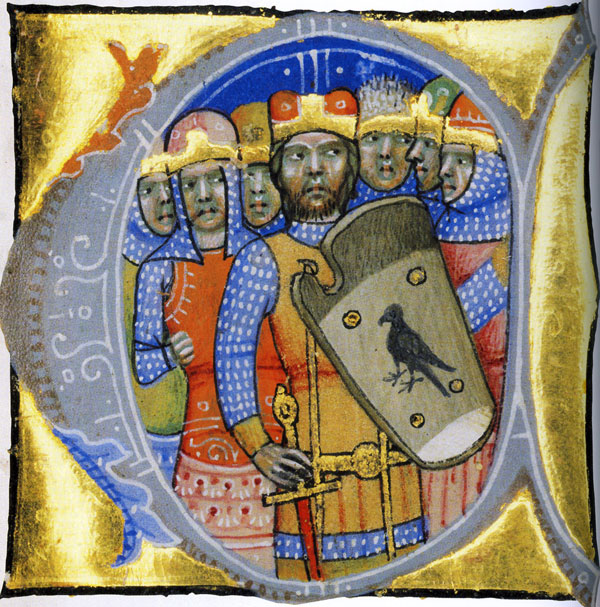
The Seven chieftains of the Hungarian tribes in the Chronicon Pictum

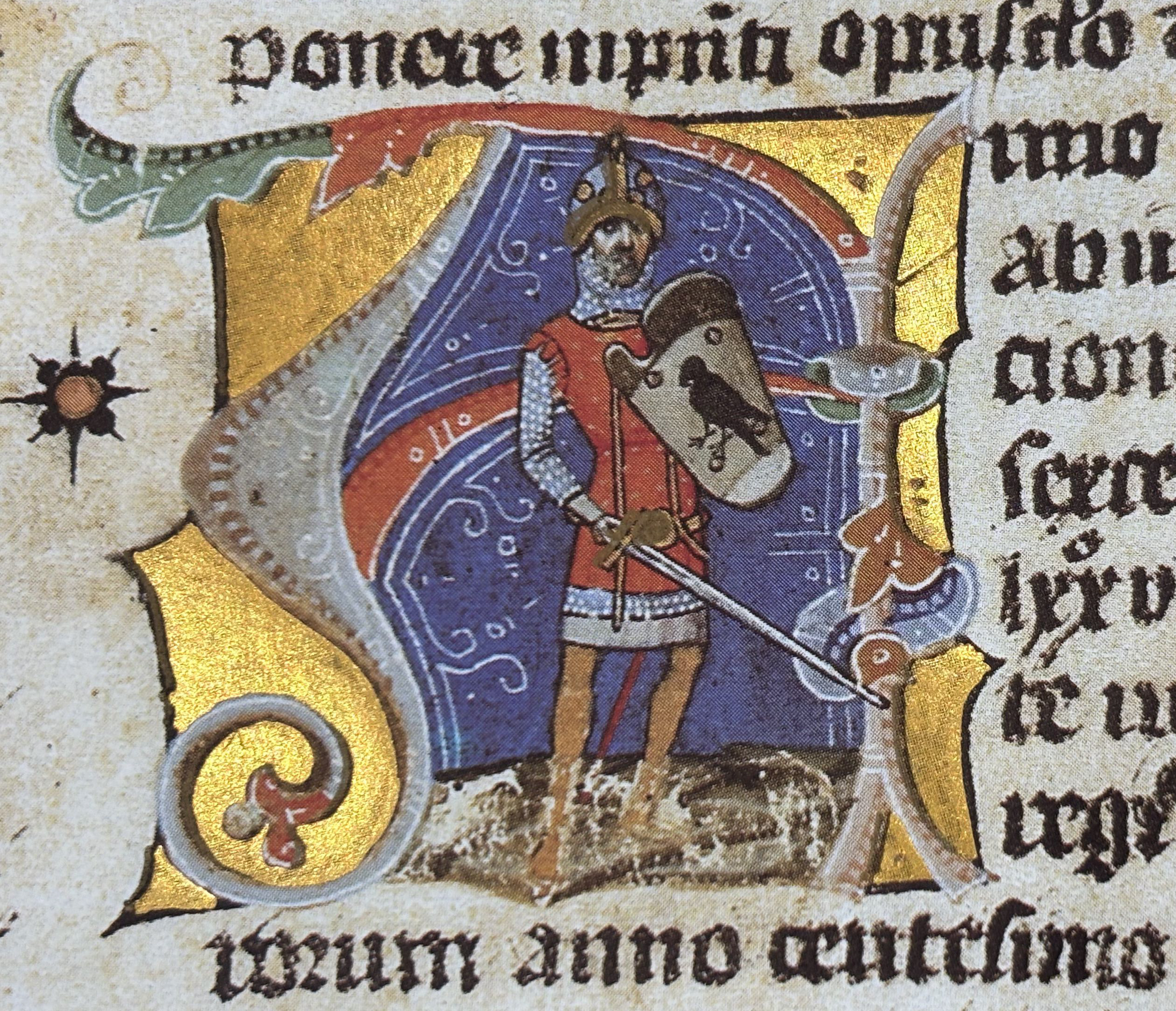
Álmos as depicted in the Chronicon Pictum

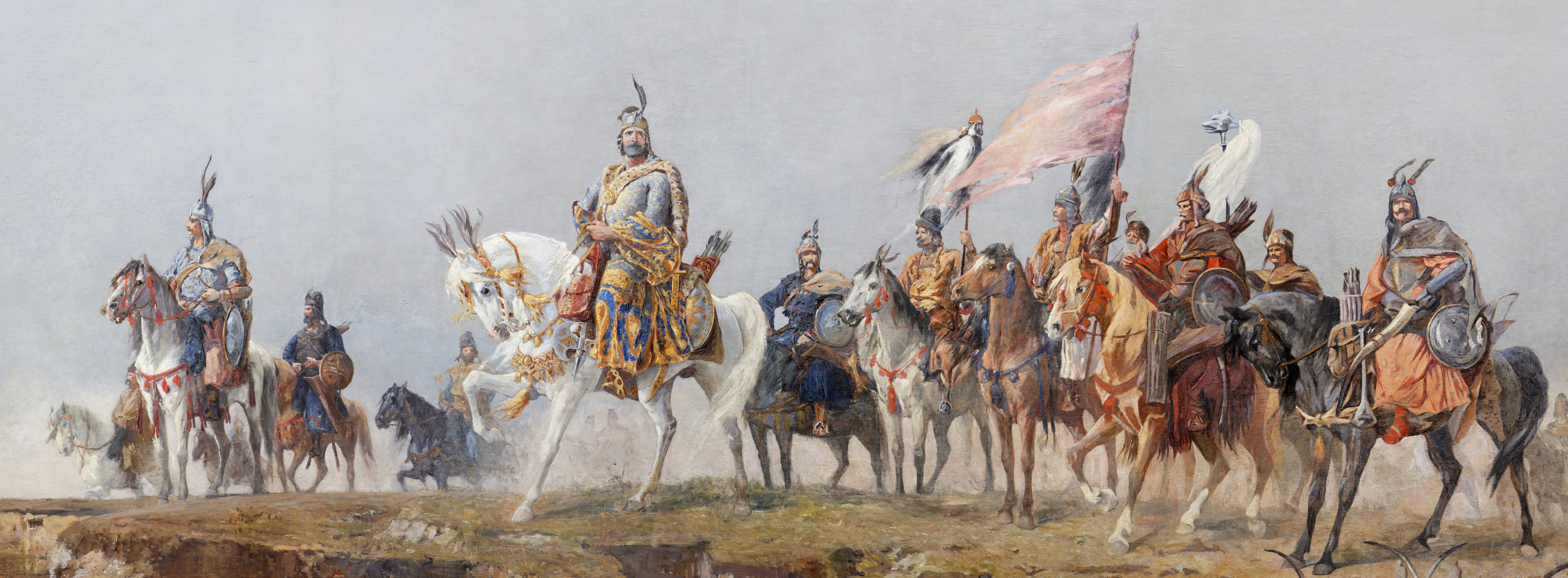
The chieftains. Detail from Árpád Feszty's cyclorama titled the Arrival of the Hungarians.

The Seven chieftains of the Magyars (or Hungarians) were the leaders of the seven tribes of the Hungarians at the time of their arrival in the Carpathian Basin in AD 895. Constantine VII, emperor of the Byzantine Empire names the seven tribes in his De Administrando Imperio, a list that can be verified with names of Hungarian settlements. The names of the chieftains, however, are not precisely known, as the chronicles include contradictory lists, some of which have been found to be false.

== Chieftains ==
Constantine VII does not give the names of the chieftains of the Hungarian tribes, but describes some aspects of the leadership.

=== According to Anonymus ===
A Hungarian chronicler known as Anonymus, author of Gesta Hungarorum, names the seven chieftains as:

- Álmos, father of Árpád
- Előd, father of Szabolcs
- Ond, father of Ete
- Kend (Kond, Kund), father of Korcán (Kurszán) and Kaplon
- Tas, father of Lél (Lehel)
- Huba
- Tétény (Töhötöm), father of Horka

Most probably all persons on this list were real and significant personalities, but the list, as that of the seven chieftains who started the conquest of the Carpathian Basin, is certainly false. Constantine VII names Tas as a grandson of Árpád. The relations of the early Hungarian leaders are subject of debate between historians.

=== According to Simon of Kéza ===
Hungarian chronicler Simon of Kéza names seven captains who led seven tribes in the Gesta Hunnorum et Hungarorum:

- Árpád, son of Álmos, who was the son of Előd, who was the son of Ügyek
- Szabolcs
- Gyula
- Örs
- Künd, father of Kusid and Kupian
- Lél
- Vérbulcsú ("Blood-Bulcsú"), whose name's origin is that "his father was killed by Germans in the battle of Krimhild", and for revenge, "he drank the blood of some, like wine".

This list, having more legendary elements, is even less credible than that of Anonymus: only Árpád and Szabolcs match the time of the conquest.

=== According to Mark of Kalt ===
Hungarian chronicler Mark of Kalt names seven captains who led seven tribes in the Chronicon Pictum:

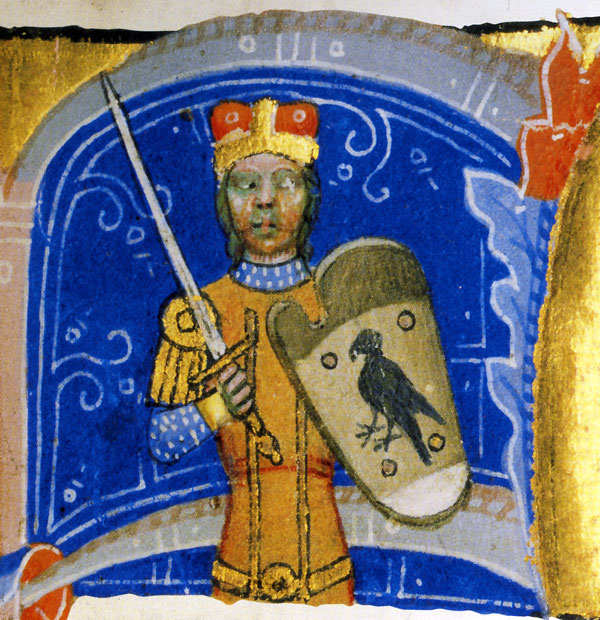
Árpád, the first captain

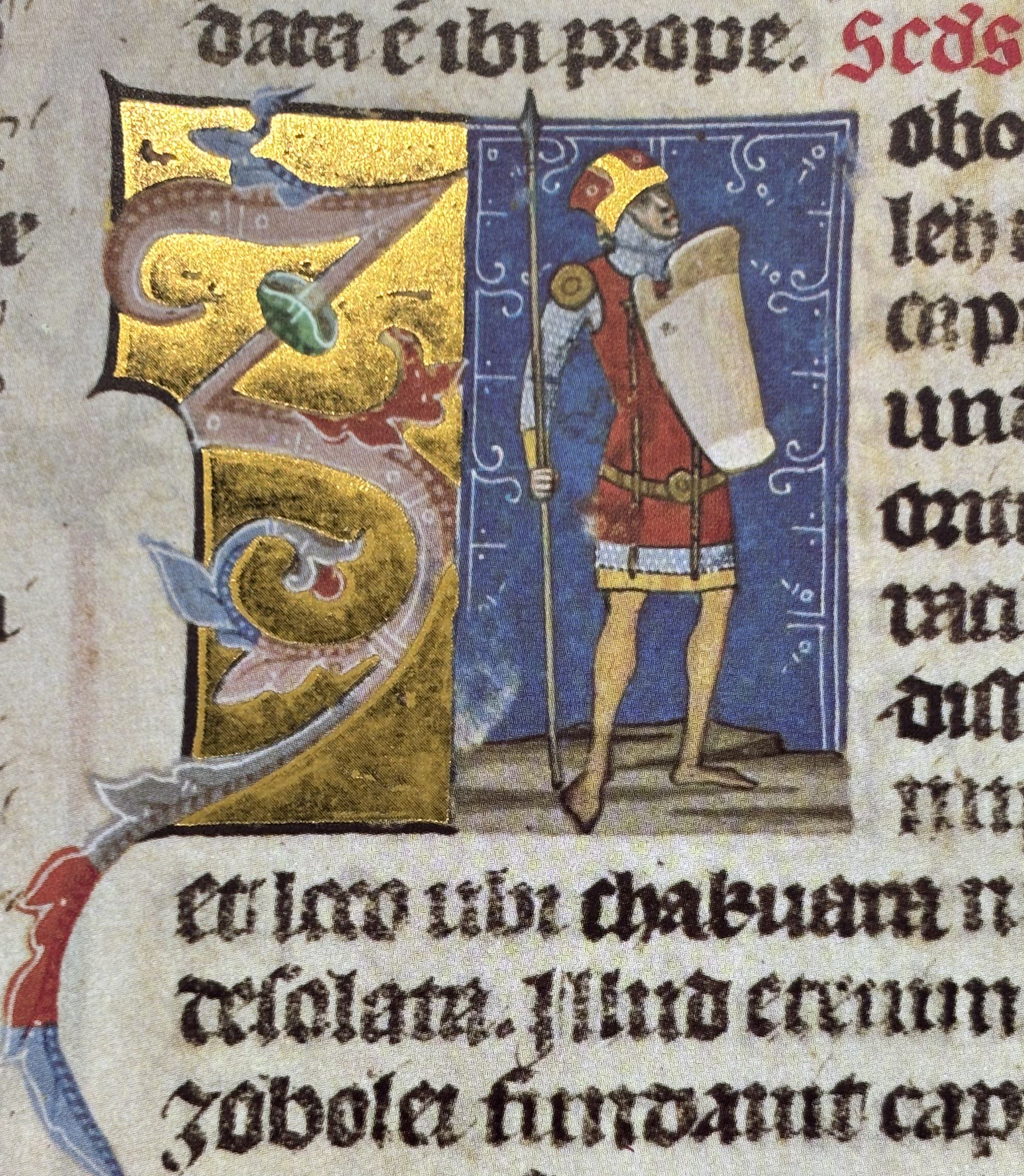
Szabolcs, the second captain

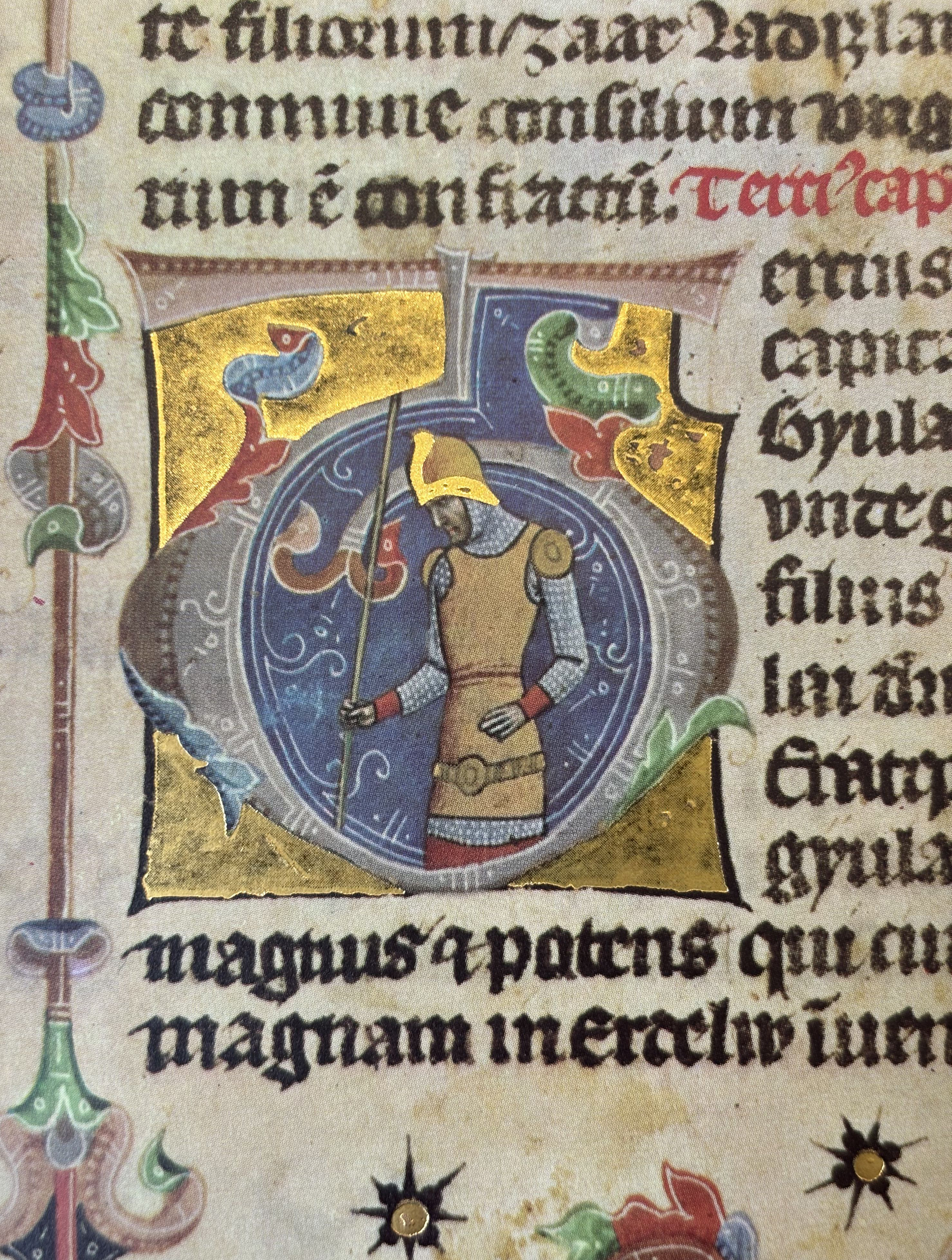
Gyula, the third captain

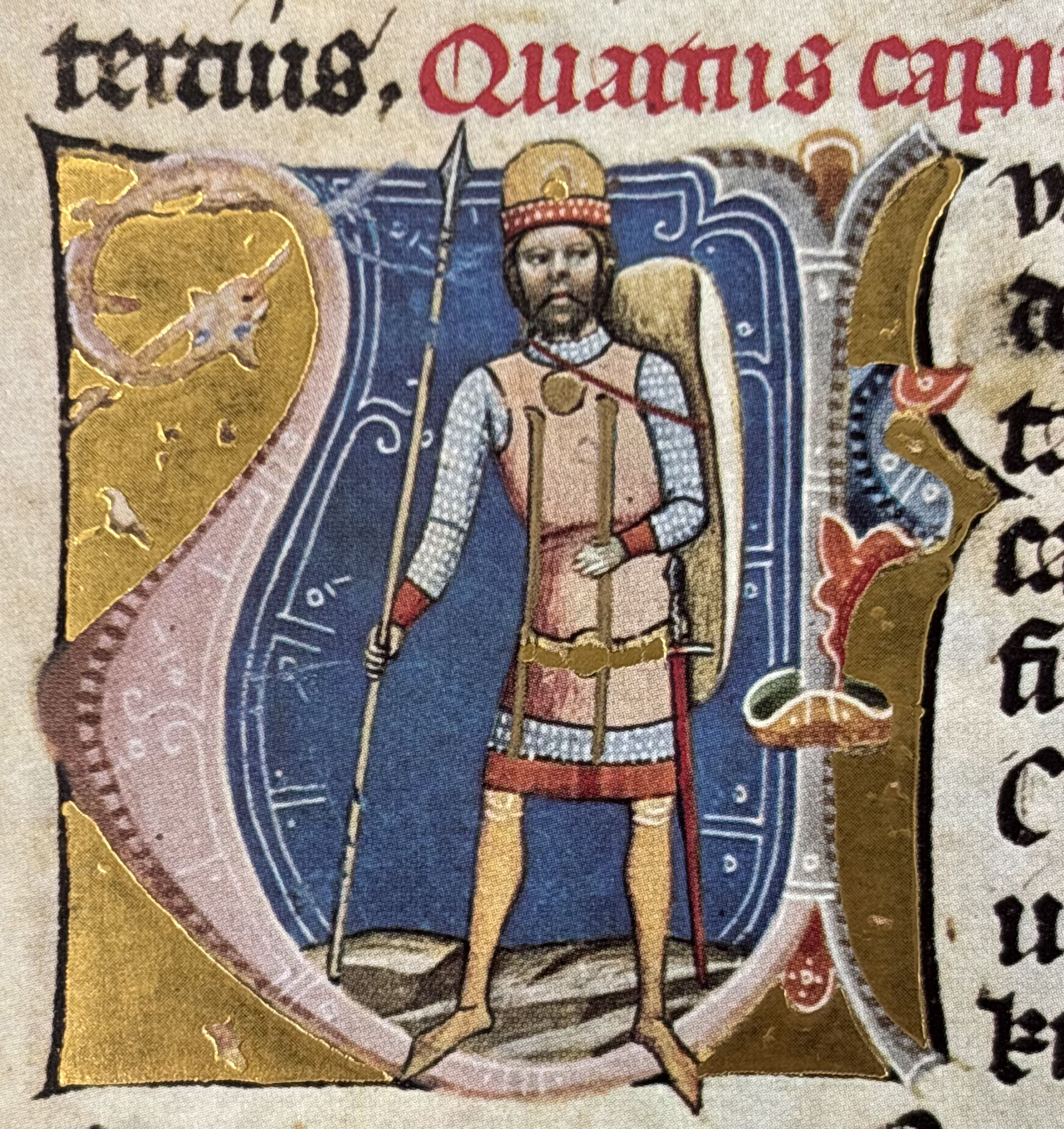
Kund, the fourth captain

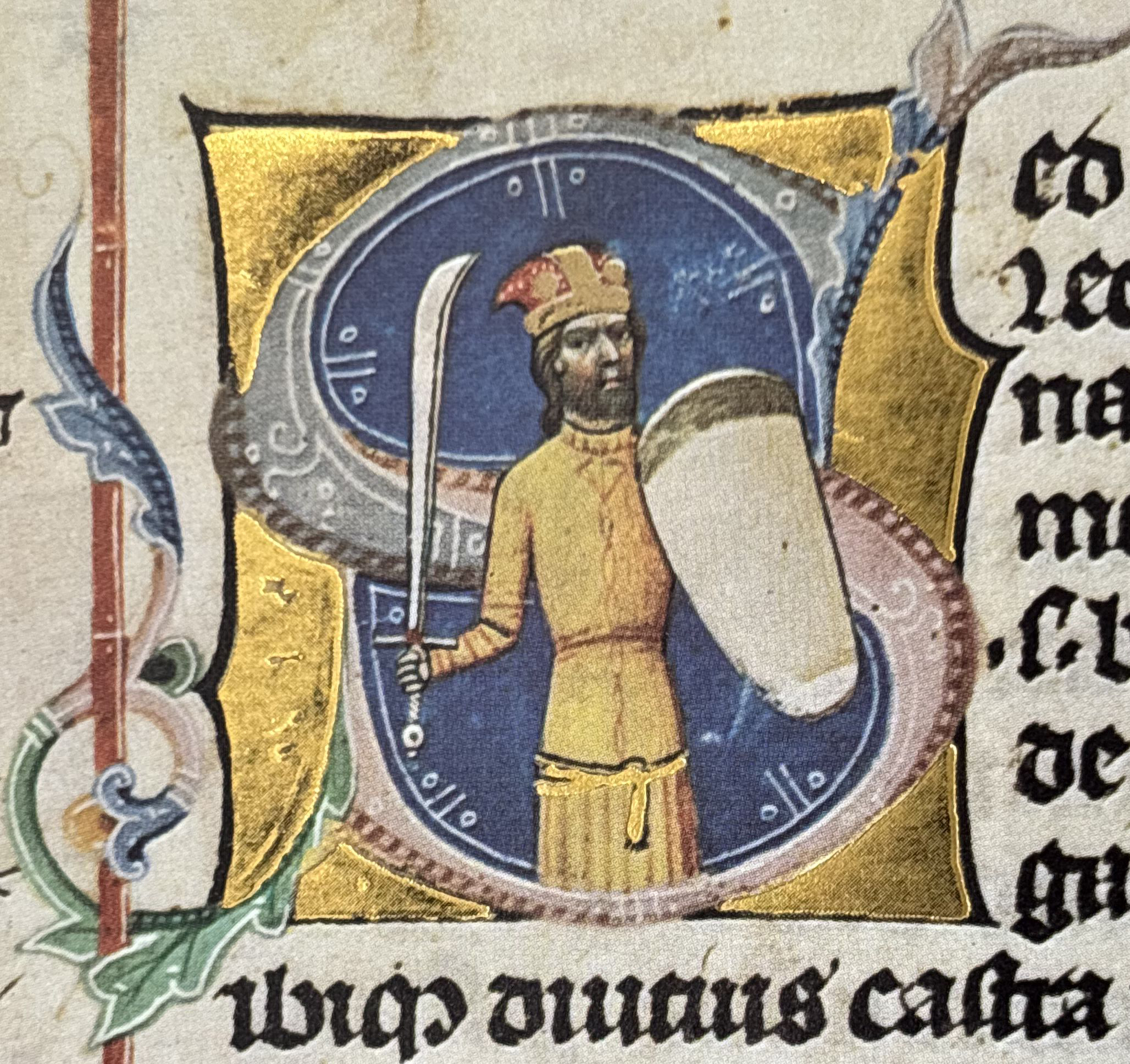
Lehel, the fifth captain

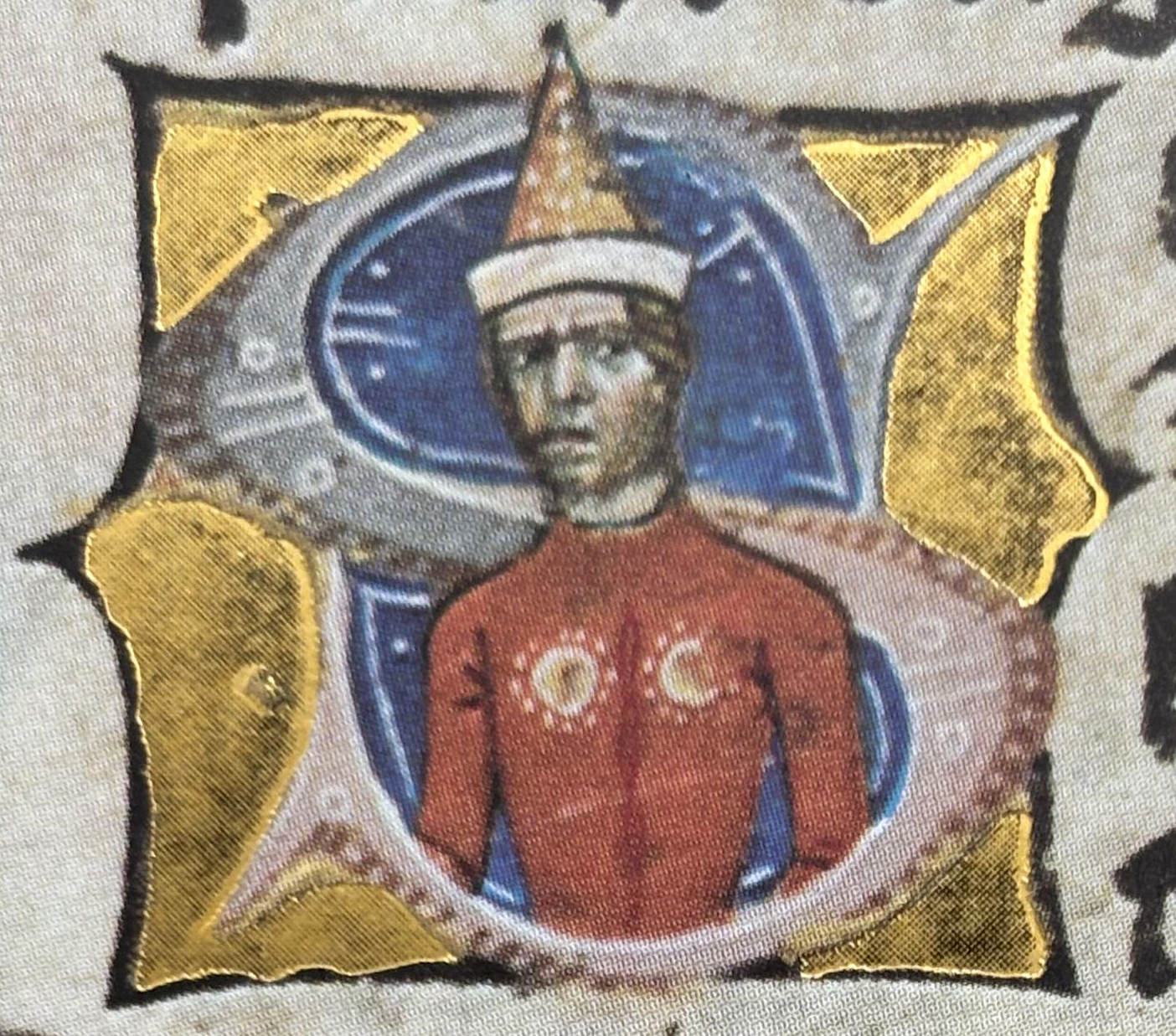
Bulcsú, the sixth captain

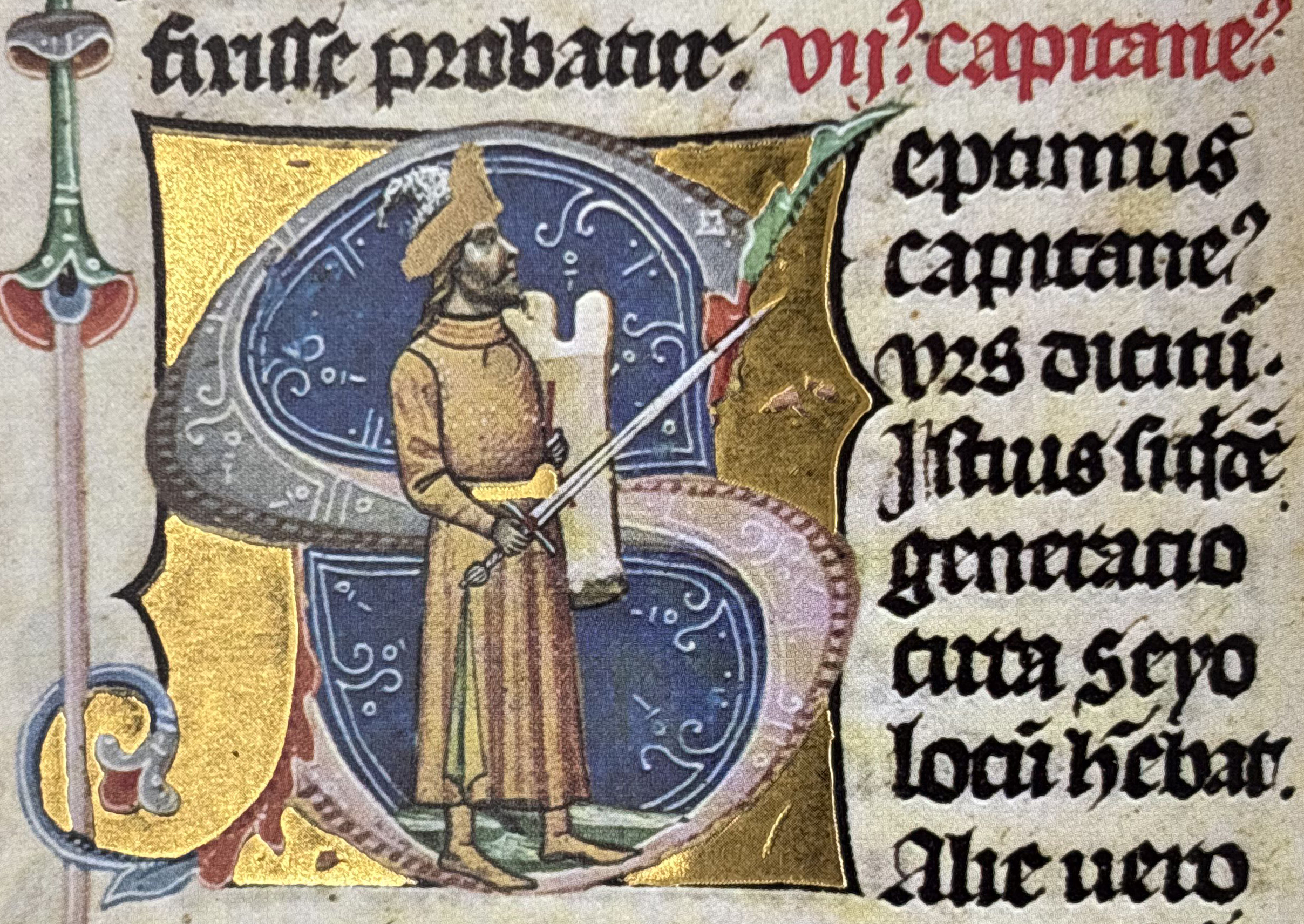
Örs, the seventh captain

And this Captain Árpád had a special dignity in Scythia, it was the custom of his clan, according to the Scythian law and tradition, that he went alone before those who went to war and those who retreated, saying, therefore he was the first to enter this land before the other captains going to Pannonia.

— Mark of Kalt: Chronicon Pictum

=== According to Johannes Thuróczy ===
Hungarian chronicler Johannes Thuróczy names seven captains who led seven tribes in the Chronica Hungarorum:

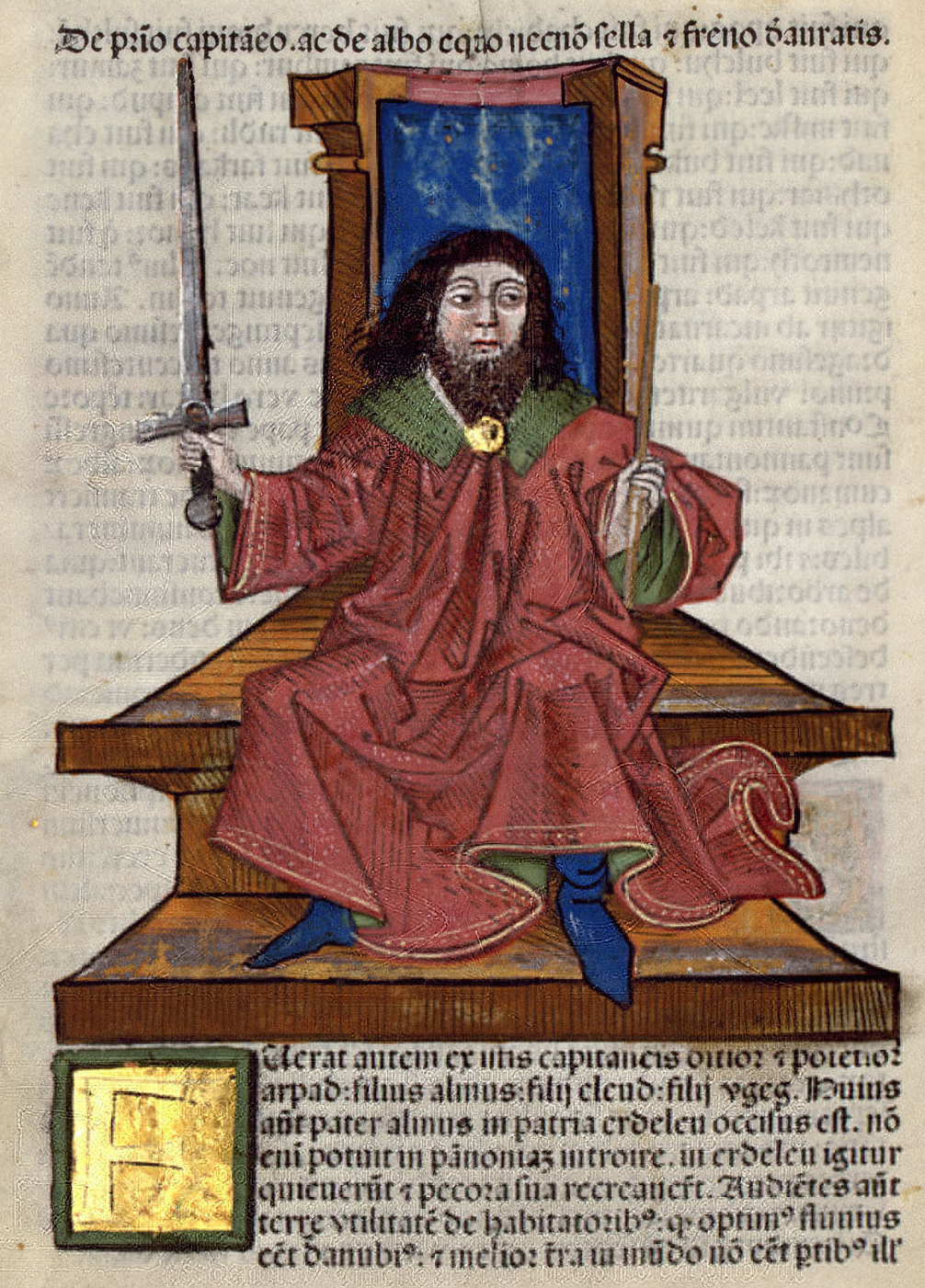
Árpád, the first captain

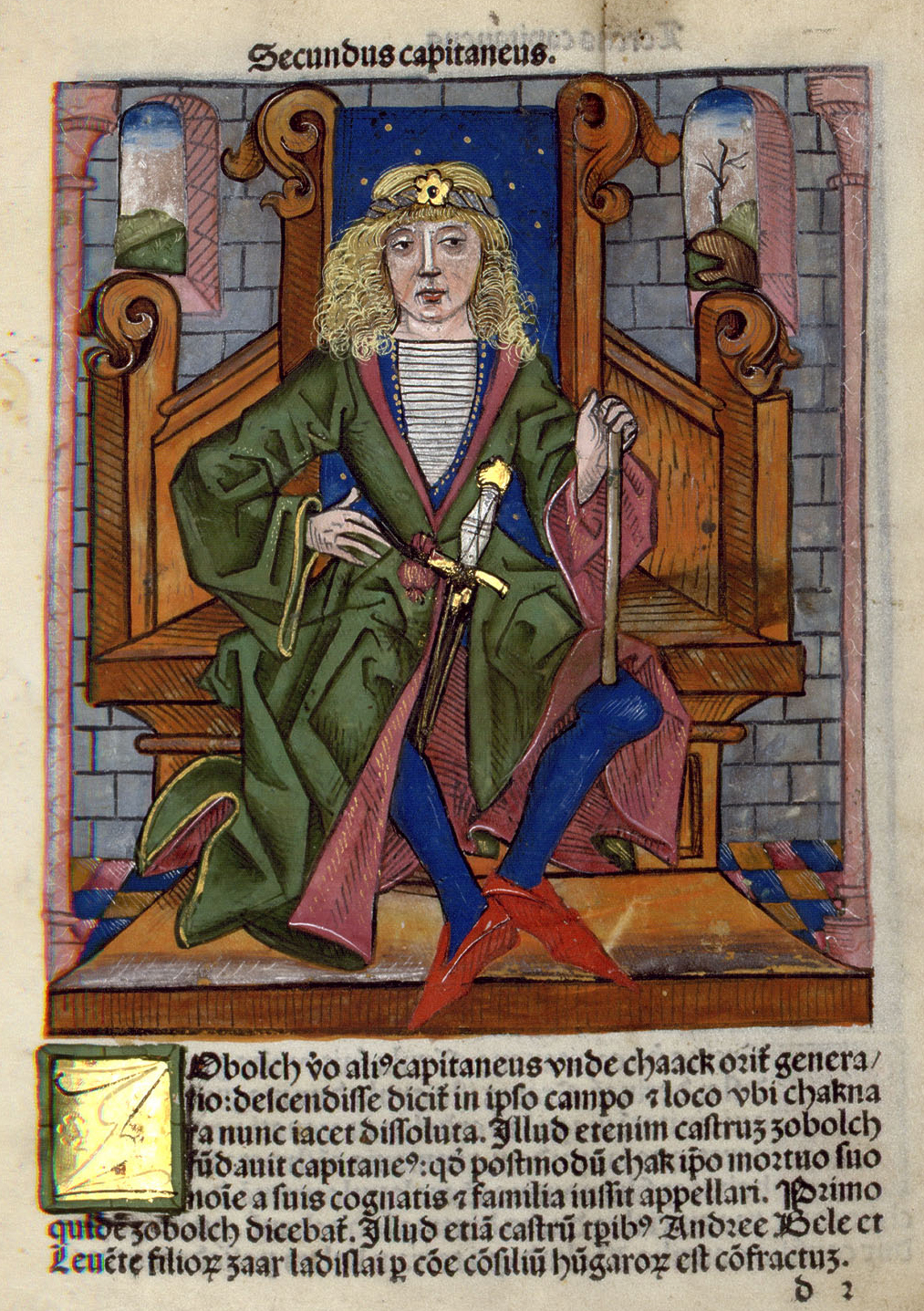
Szabolcs, the second captain

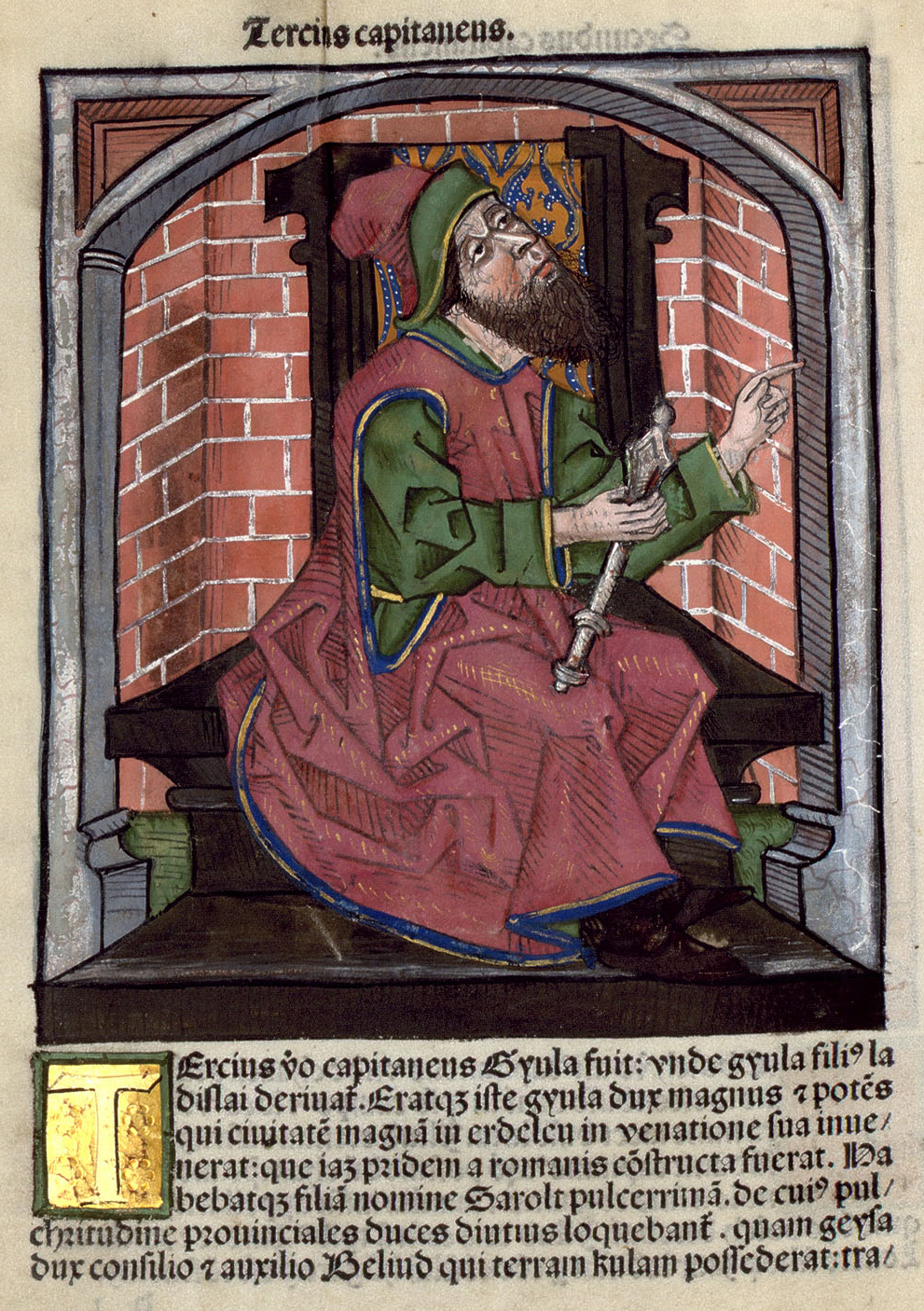
Gyula, the third captain

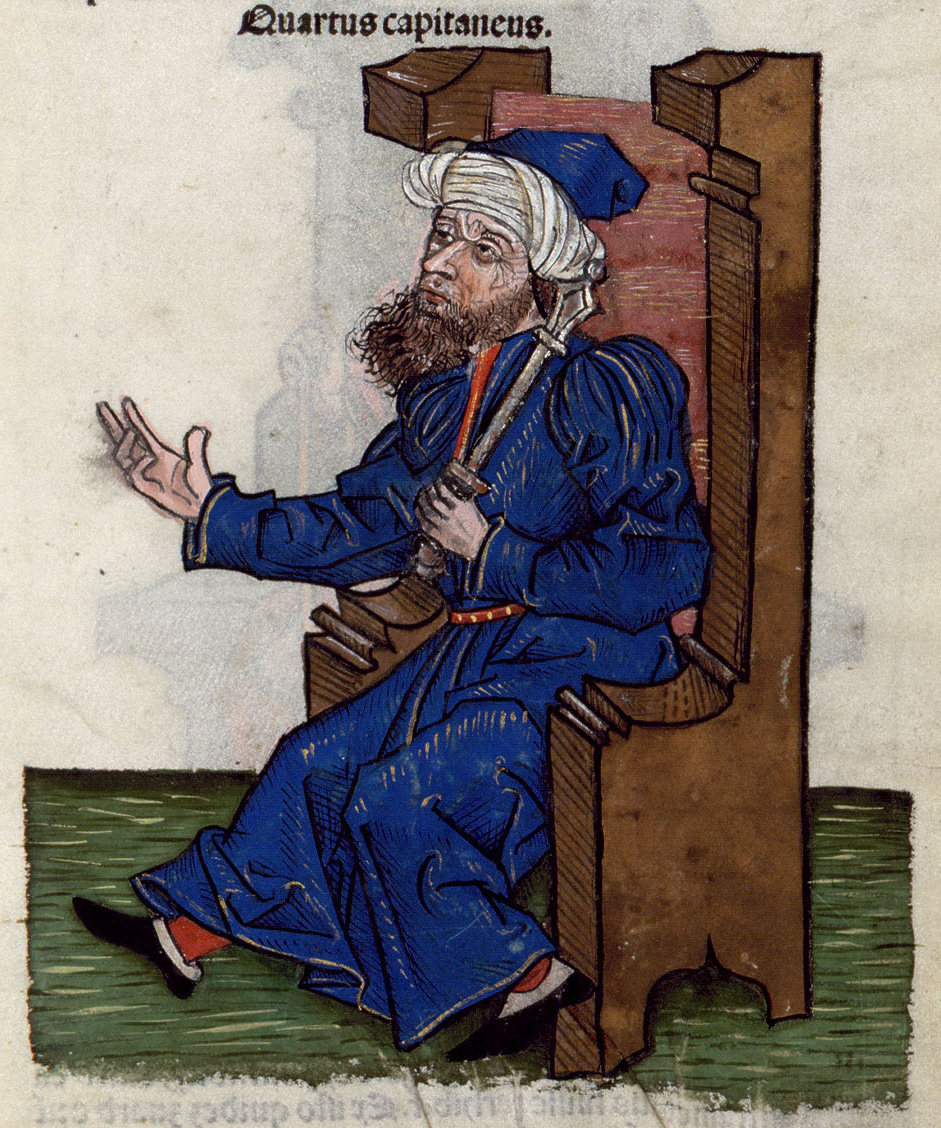
Kund, the fourth captain

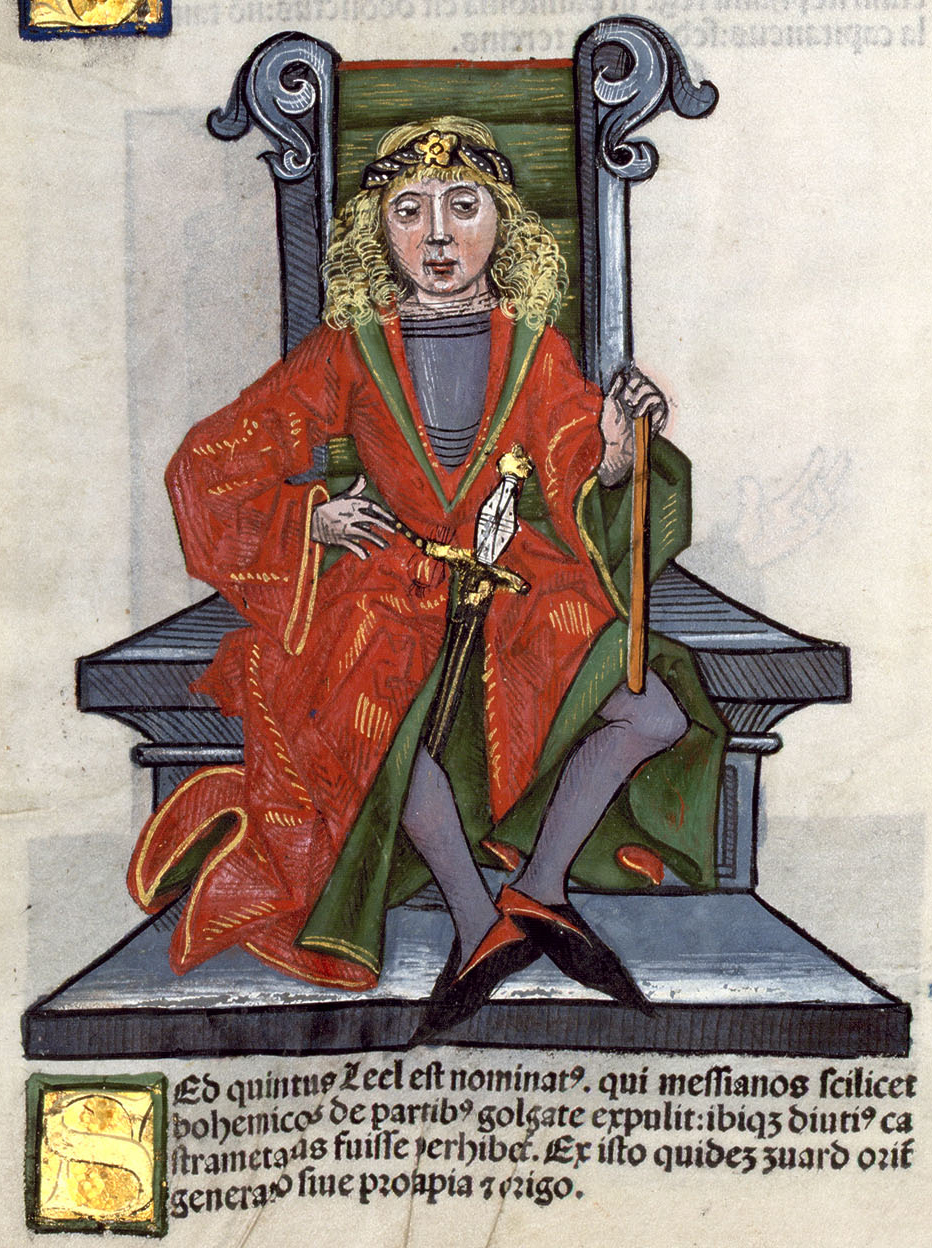
Lehel, the fifth captain

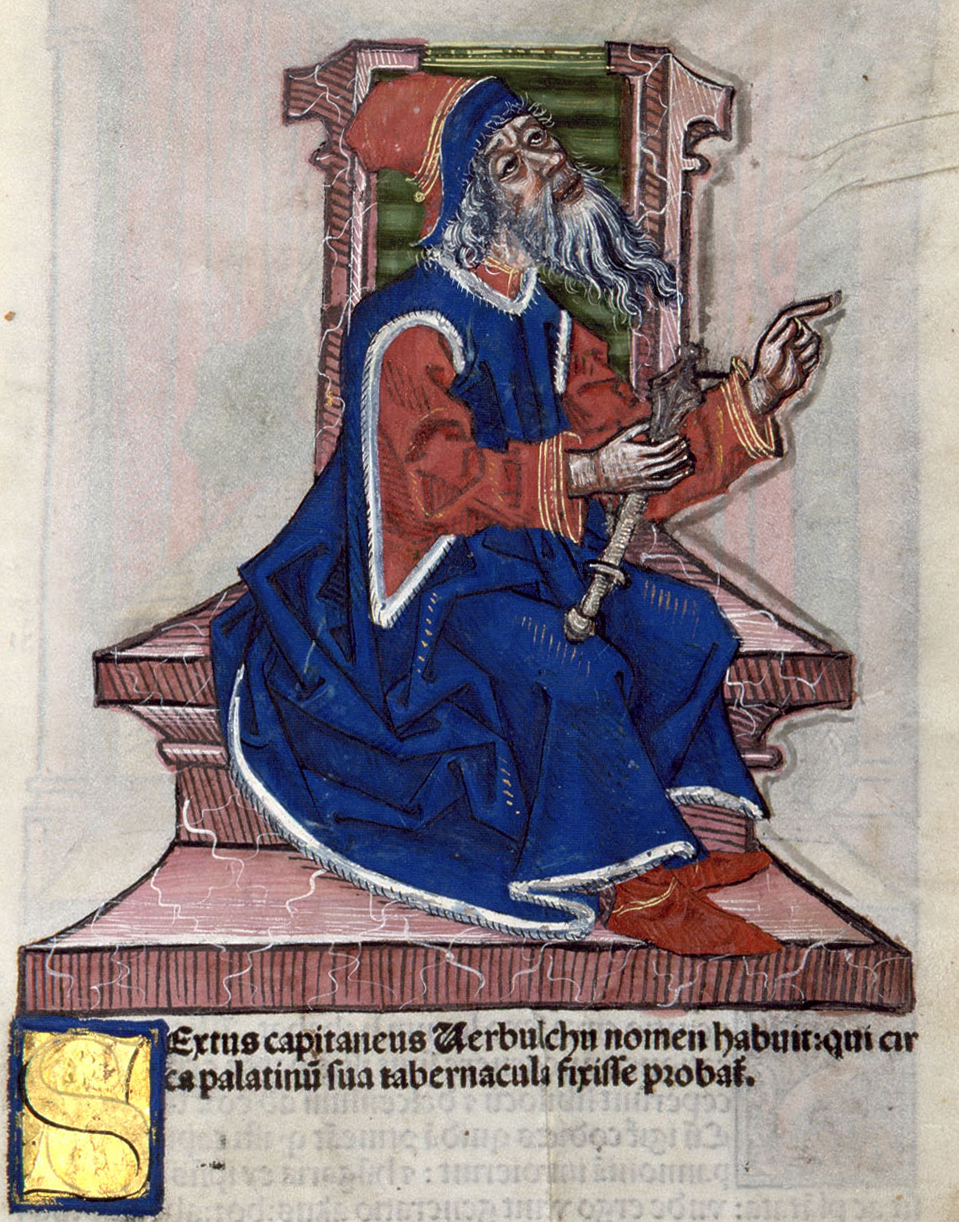
Vérbulcsú, the sixth captain

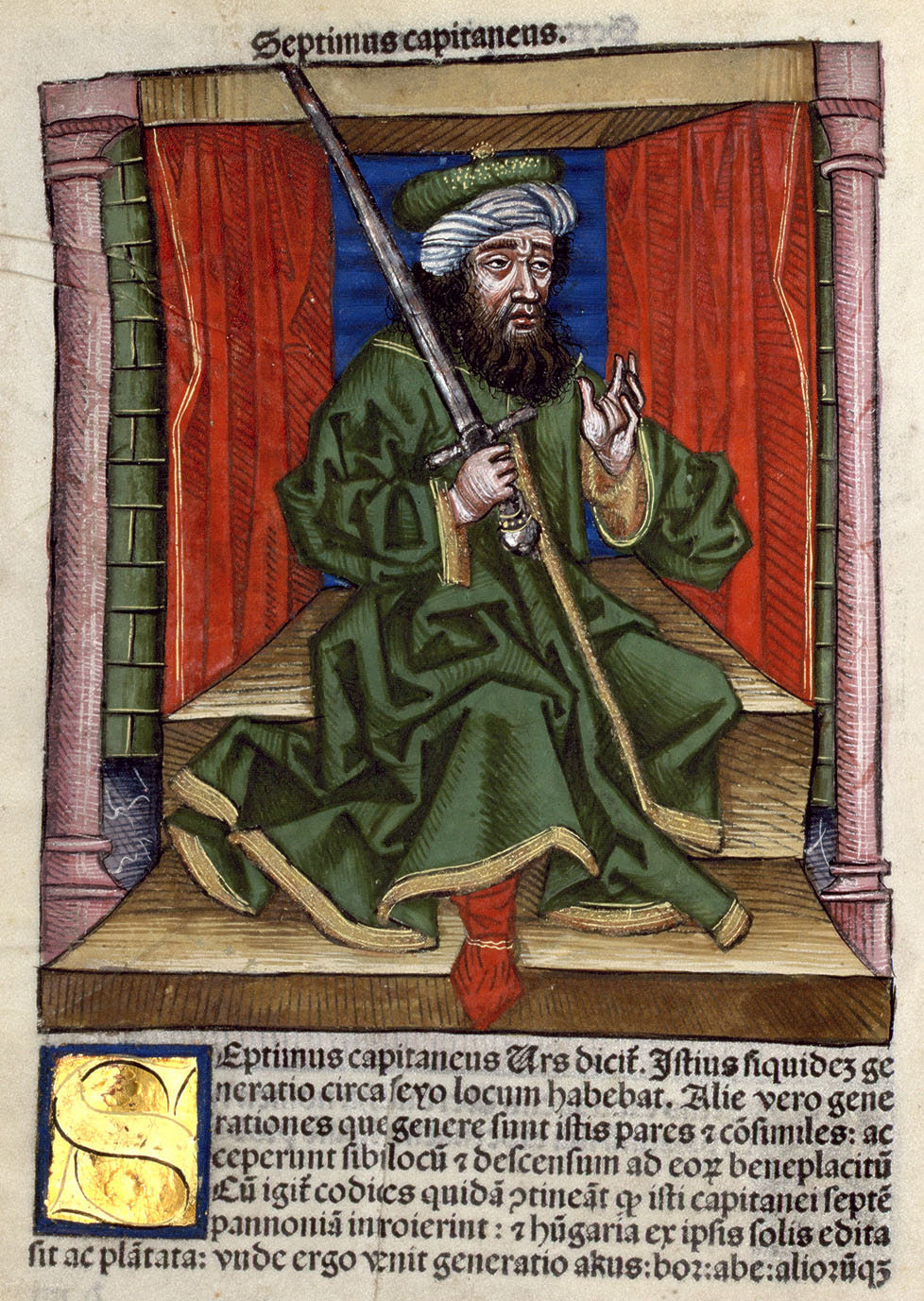
Örs, the seventh captain

=== In the Nádasdy Mausoleum ===
The seven Hungarian leaders depicted in Nádasdy Mausoleum:

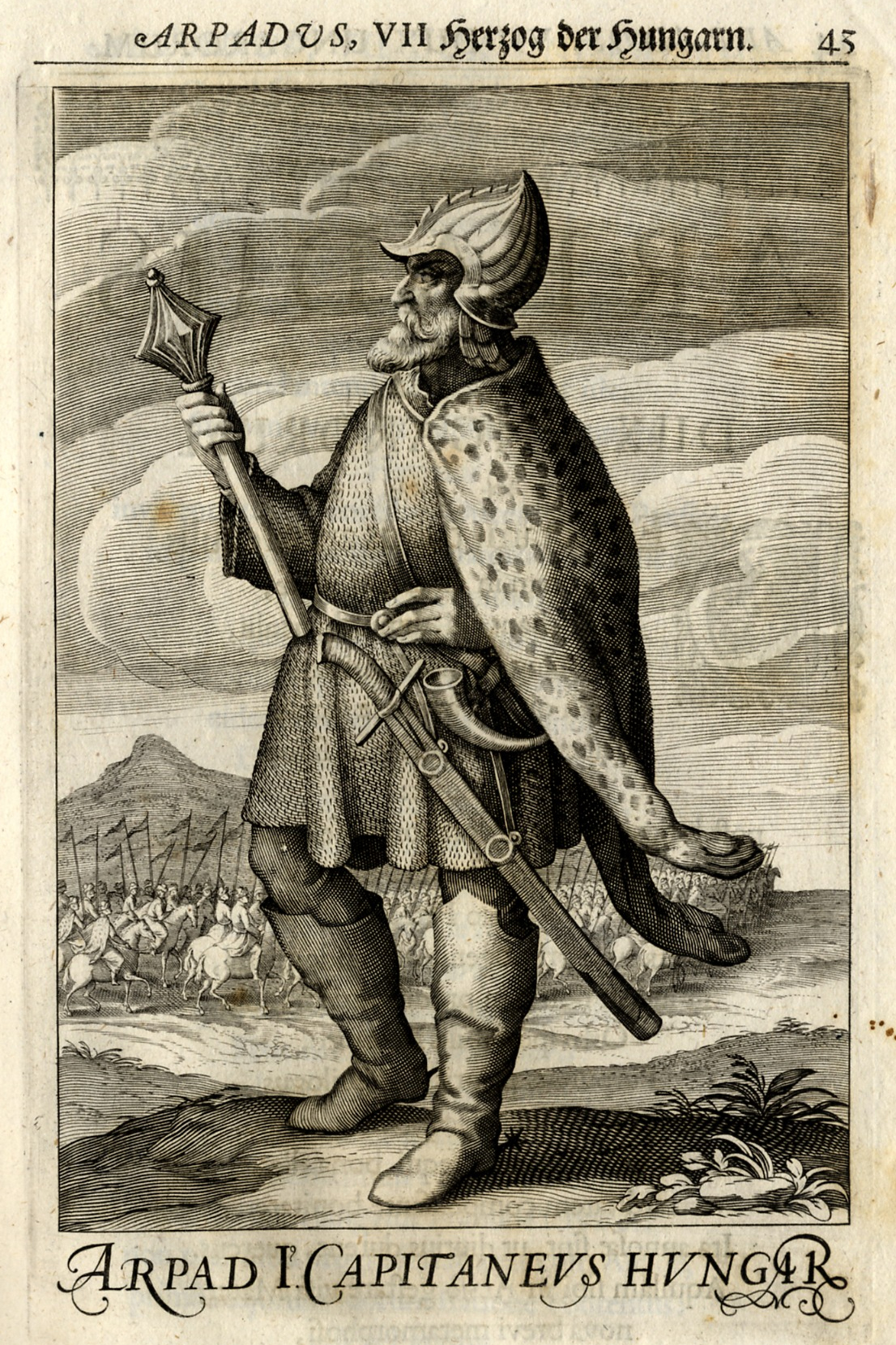
Árpád

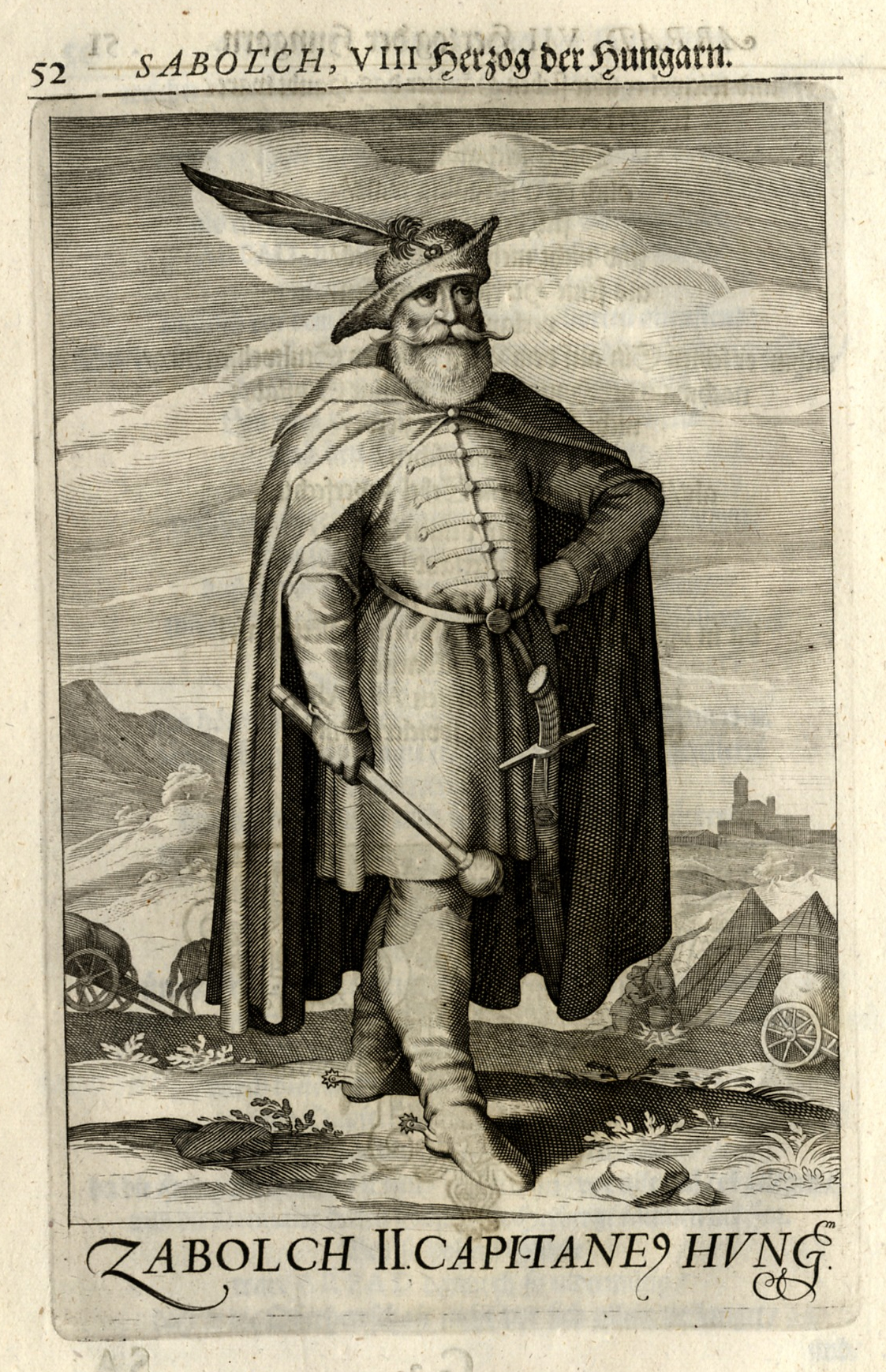
Szabolcs

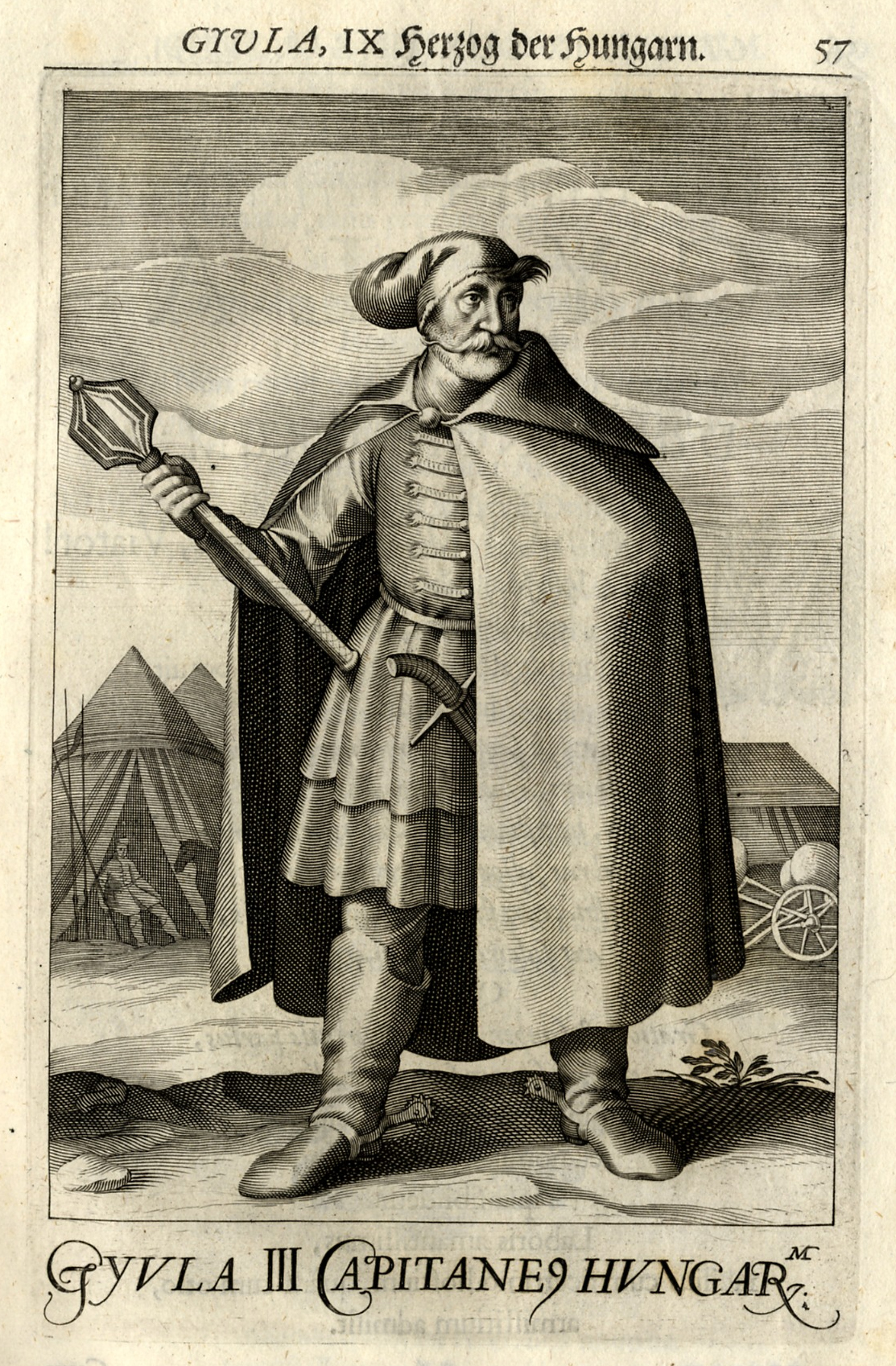
Gyula

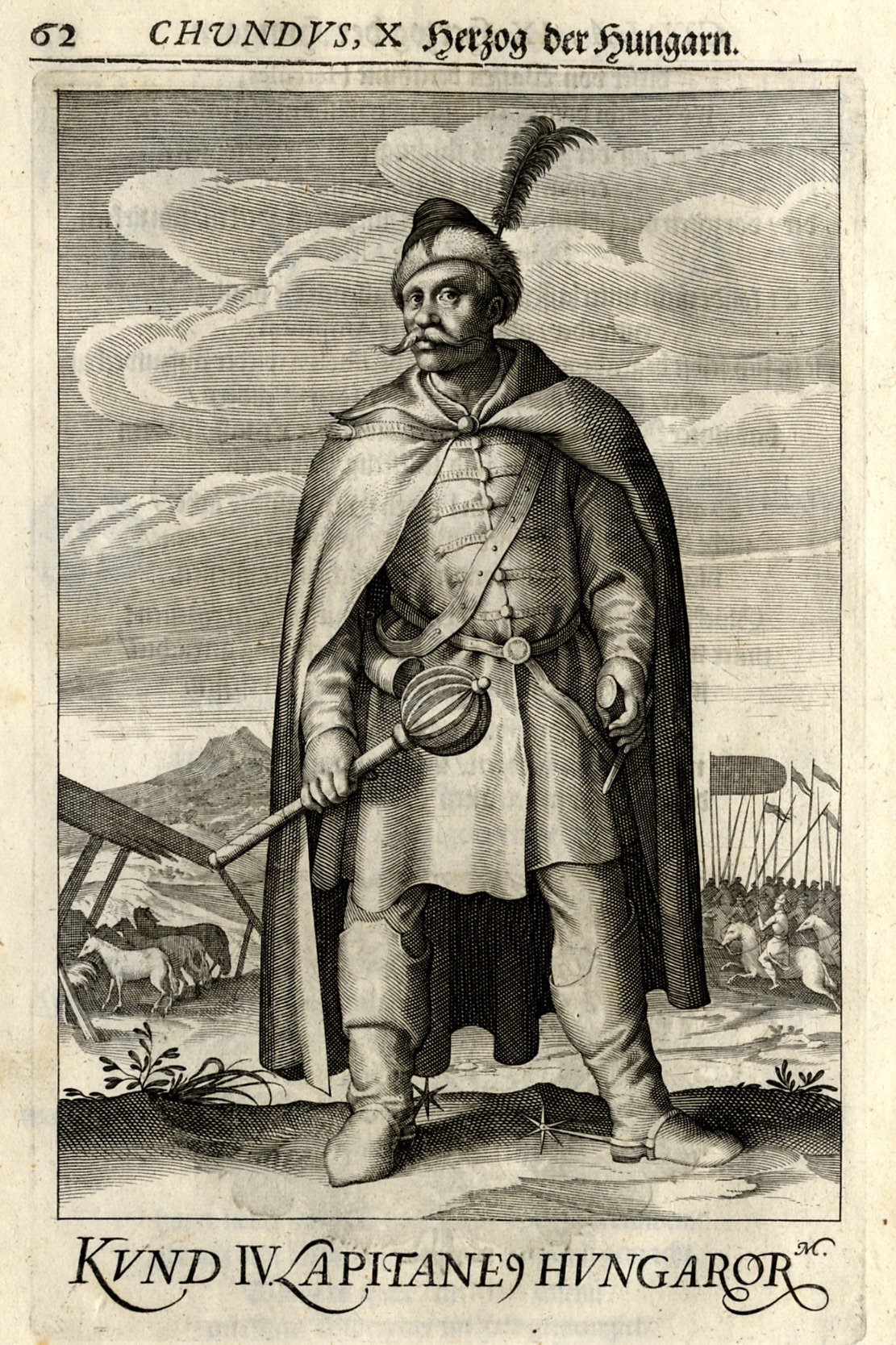
Kund

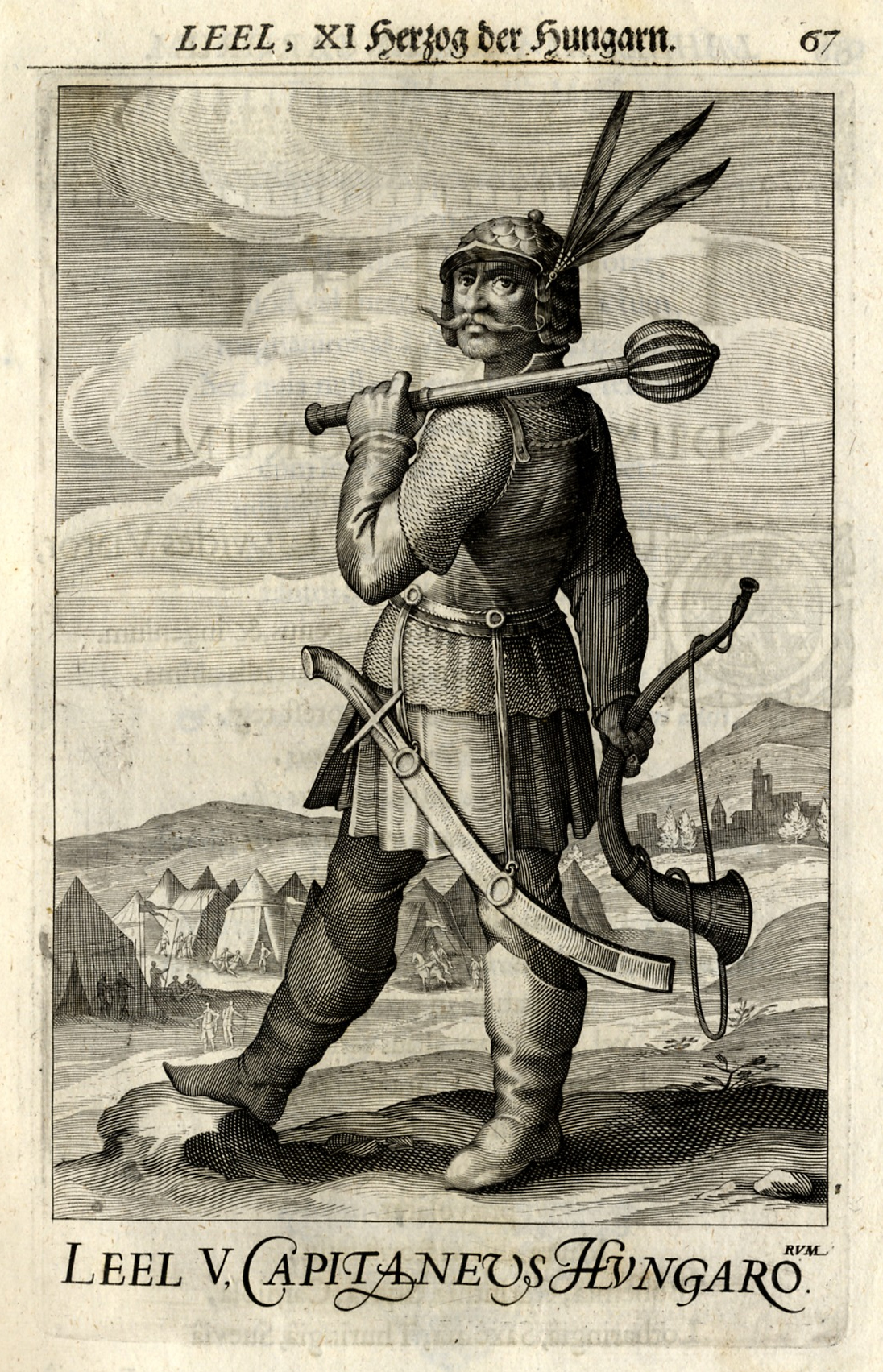
Lehel

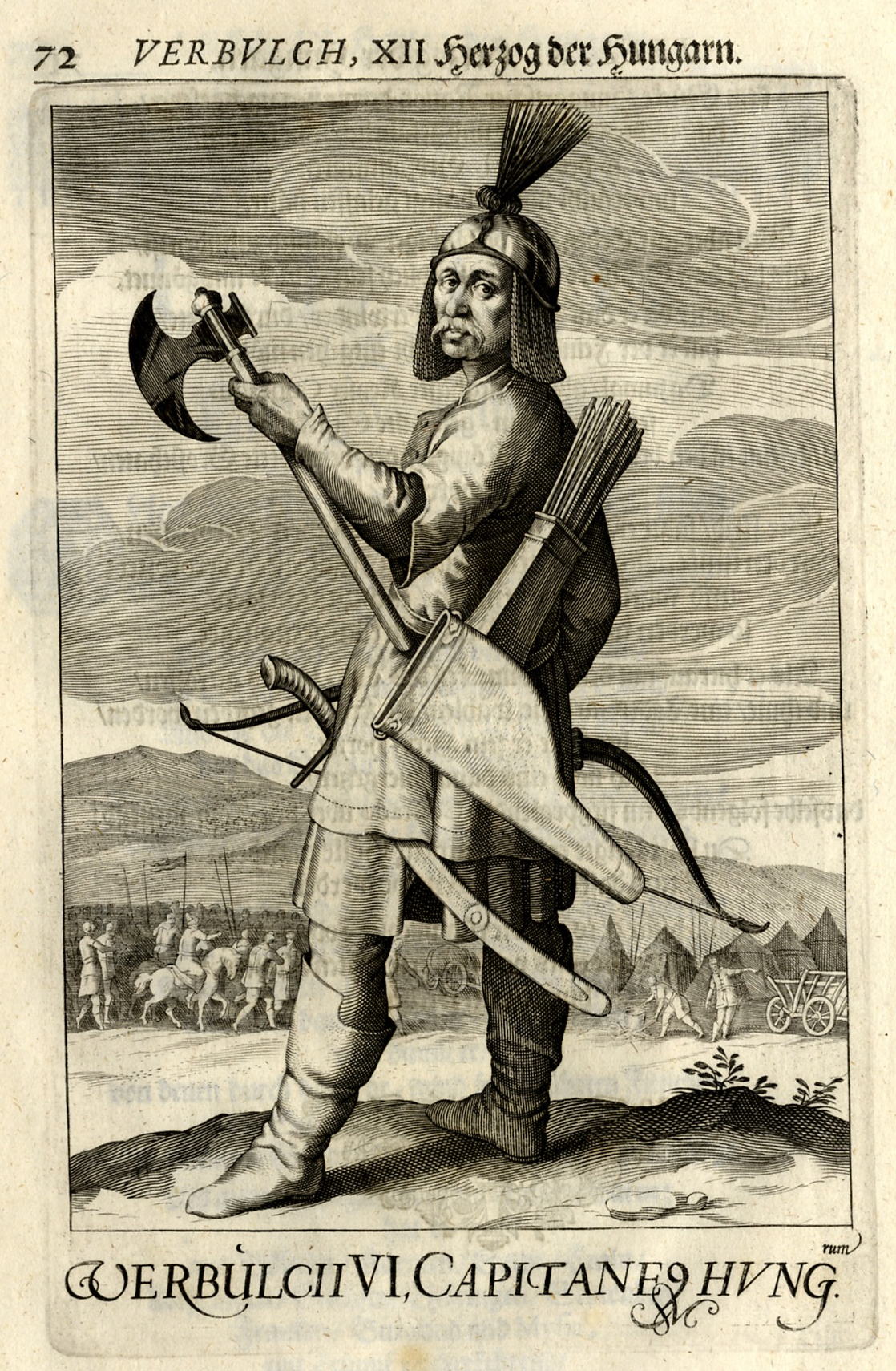
Vérbulcsú

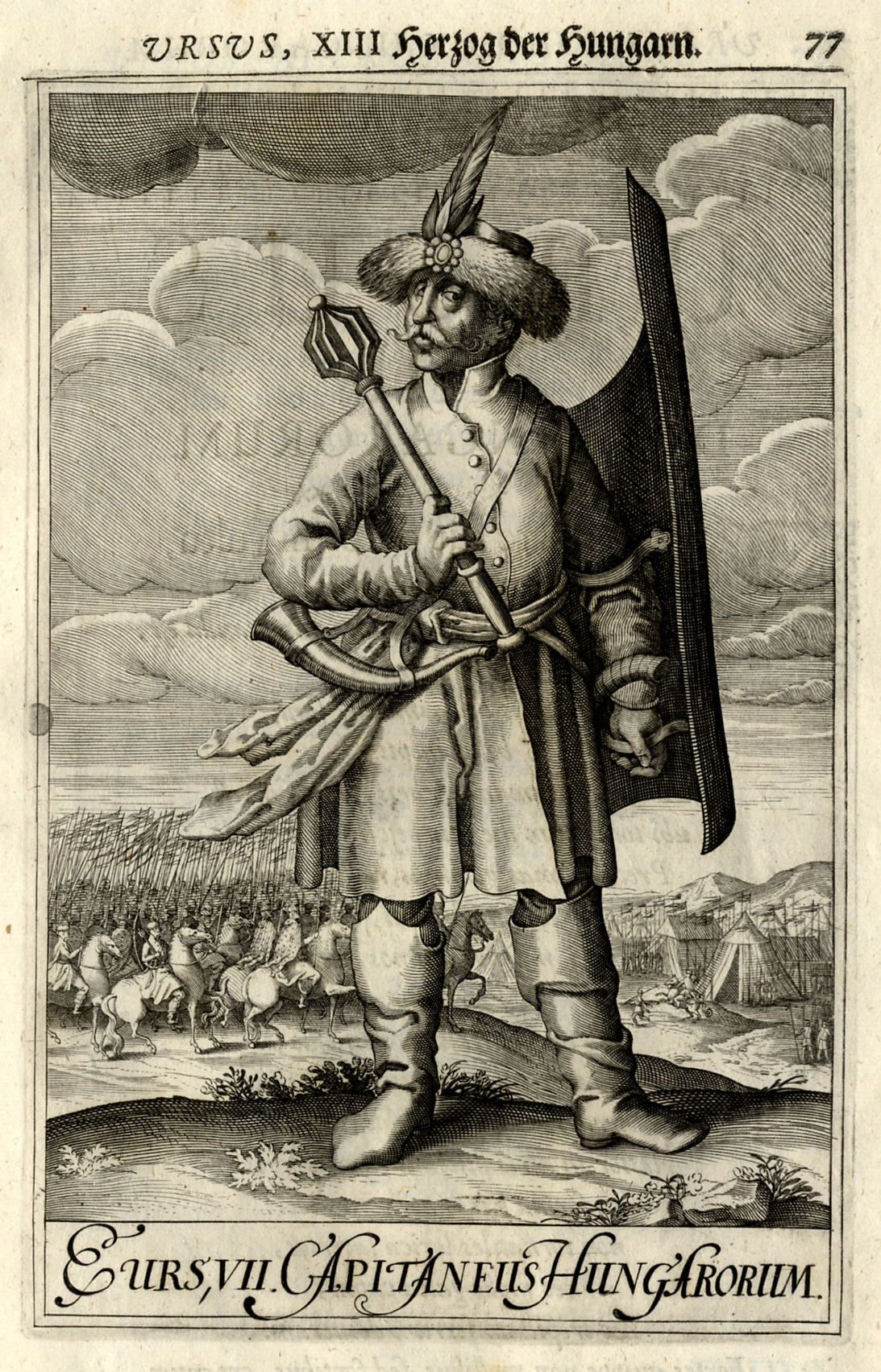
Örs

== Statues ==
In Budapest, Hungary, the Heroes' Square, better known as Hősök tere, has a representation of the different chieftains at the base of the column. At the base of the column is a group of seven mounted figures representing the Magyar chieftains who led the Hungarian people into the Carpathian basin. In the front is Árpád, considered the founder of the Hungarian nation. Behind him are the chieftains Előd, Ond, Kond, Tas, Huba, and Töhötöm (Tétény). Little survives in the historical record about these individuals and both their costumes and their horses are considered to be more fanciful than historically accurate.

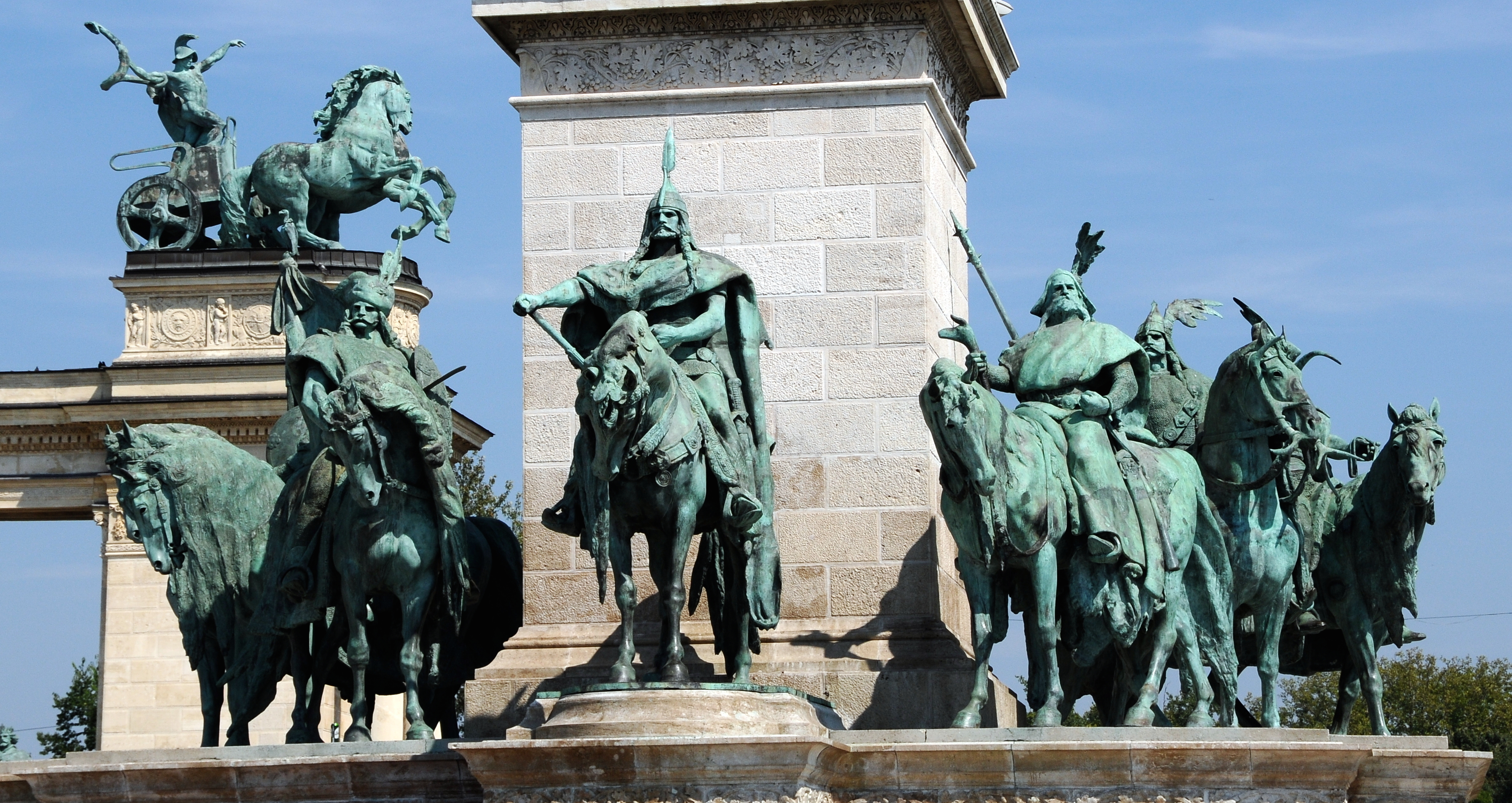
Statues of the Seven Chieftains on the Hősök tere (Heroes' Square) in Budapest, Hungary

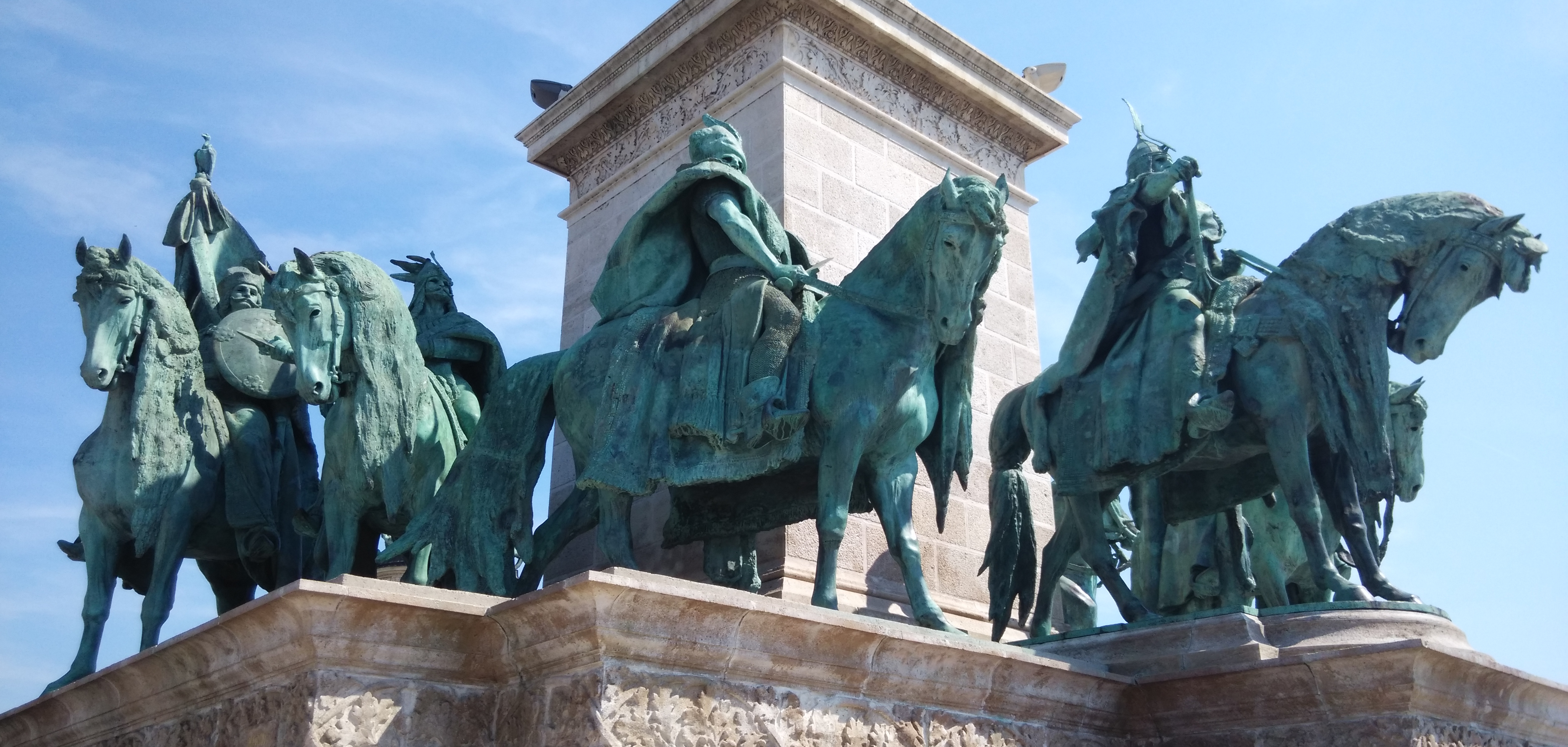
Left side view of some of the statues of the Seven chieftains of the Magyars

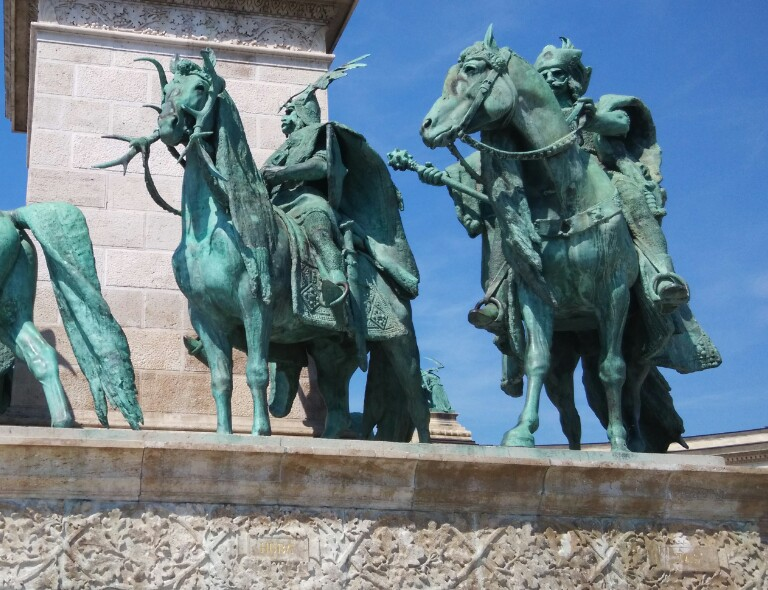
Side view of two of the seven statues of the Seven chieftains of the Magyars. Left: Huba. Right: Tas

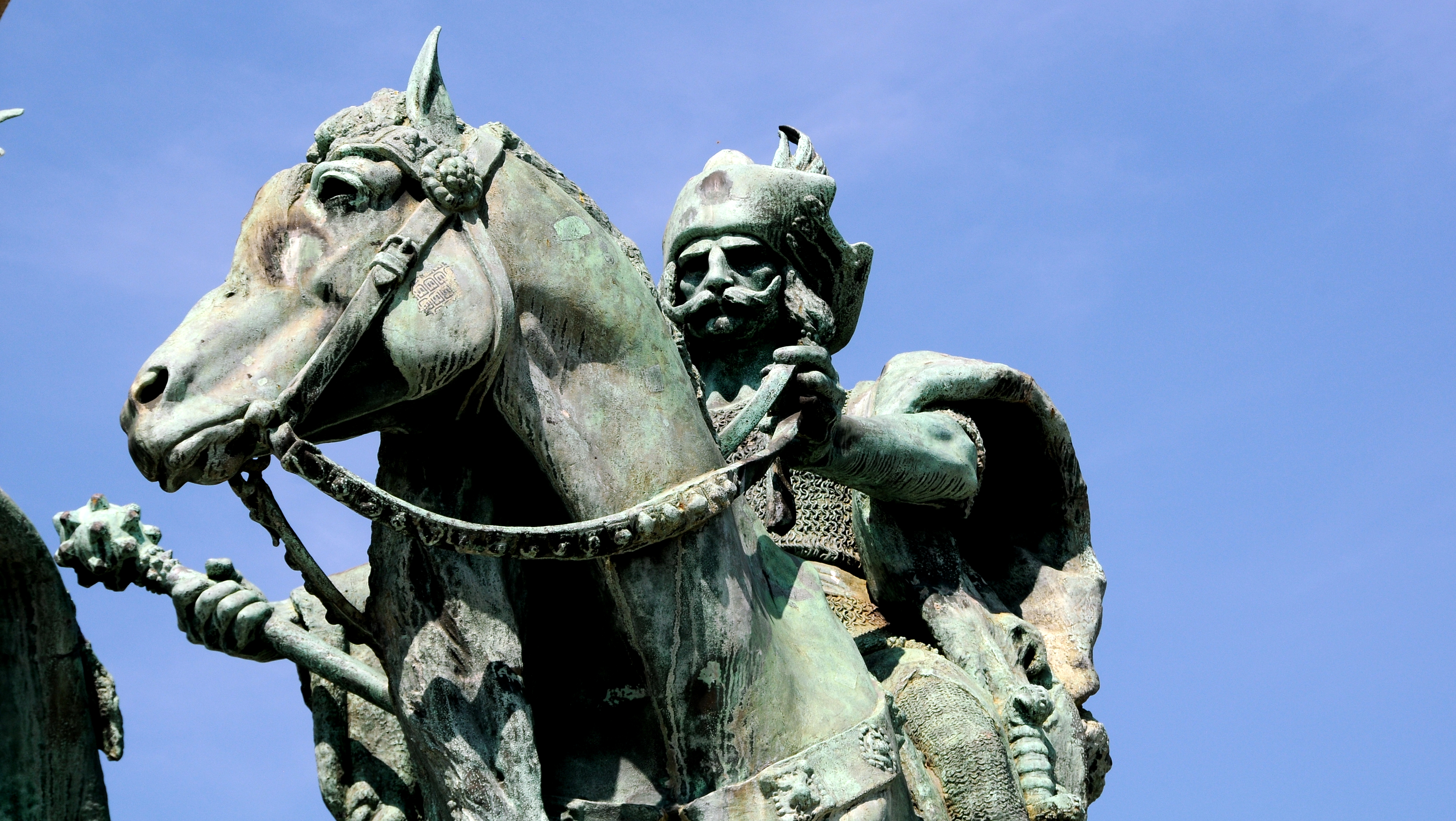
Tas, a Magyar chieftain

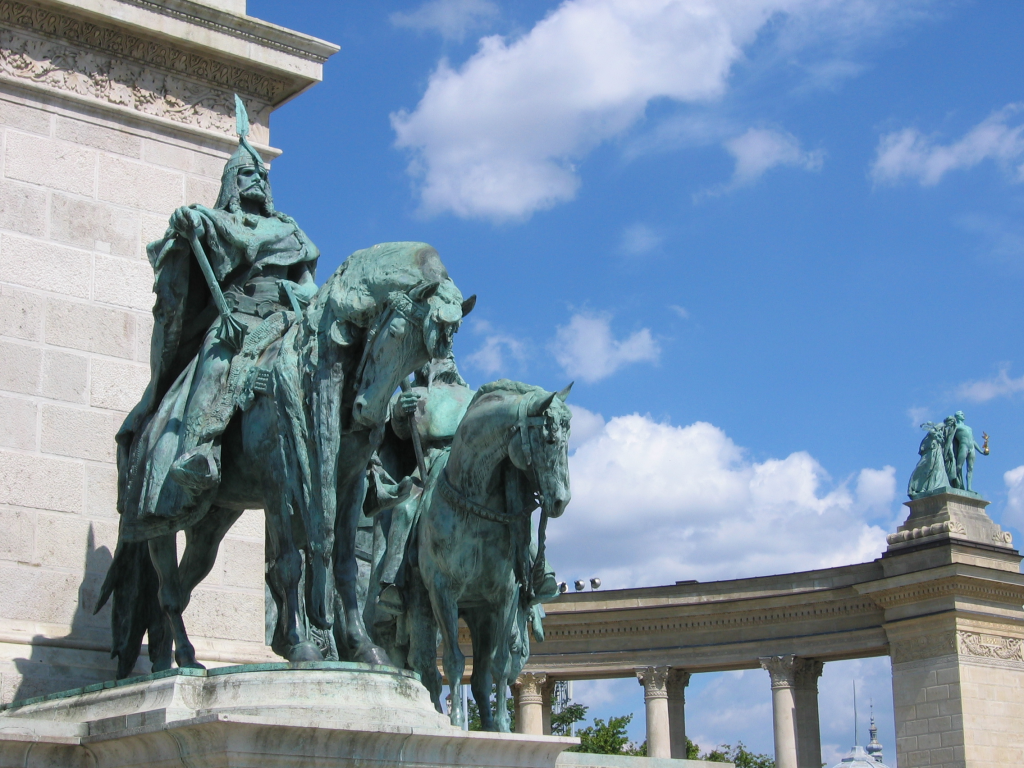
Árpád leading the other chieftains

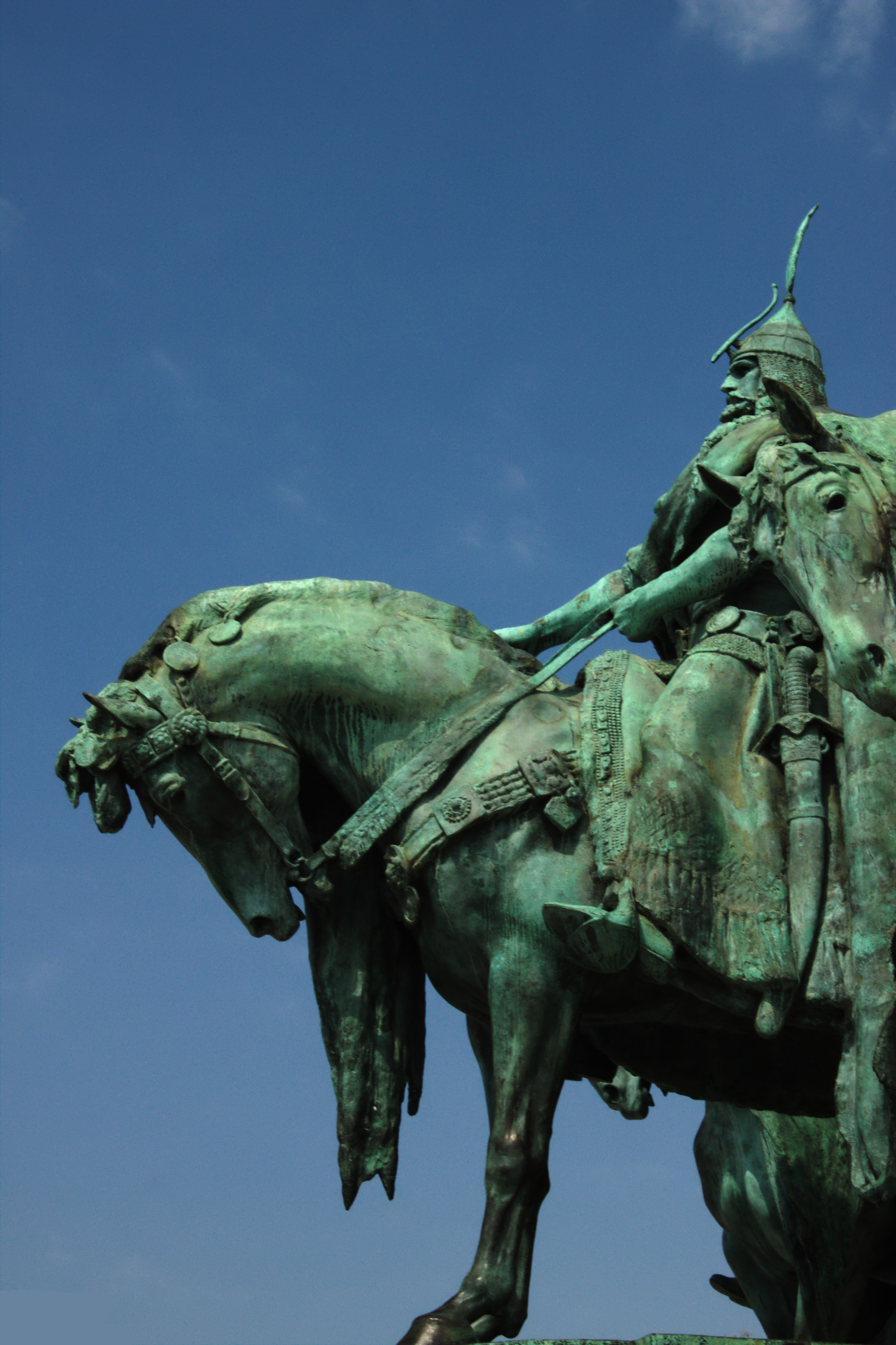
Árpád's left profile

== See also ==
- Hősök tere
- Magyar tribes
