= Andrew Kaplon =

Hungarian nobleman

Andrew (I) Kaplon

Ispán of Ung
- Reign: 1273
- Predecessor: Egidius Monoszló (1266)
- Successor: Mojs Ákos (1284)
- Died: 1302/1307
- Noble family: gens Kaplon
- Issue: Lawrence; Jakó IV; Michael; Catherine; Anne
- Father: Jakó I
- Mother: Catherine N

Andrew (I) from the kindred Kaplon (Hungarian: Kaplon nembeli (I.) András; died 1302/1307) was a Hungarian nobleman at the turn of the 13th and 14th centuries, who served as ispán of Ung County in 1273. He is ancestor of several noble families, including the illustrious Sztáray (Sztárai) family.

== Ancestry and career ==
Andrew was born into the Nagymihály branch of the ancient kindred Kaplon (also Kaplyon or Kaplony) as the son of Jakó (I), the first known member of the branch, who served as ispán of Zólyom County from 1243 to 1245 and in 1262. His mother was Catherine, the daughter of Peter, who himself was the son of Szoboszló and grandson of Apa, the Ban of Slavonia in the mid-12th century. Andrew had a brother Jakó (II), who served as Master of the cupbearers from 1279 to 1280.

Andrew's career strongly connected to the social advancement of his brother Jakó in his entire life. Throughout from 1249 to 1258, the brothers were granted several villages from their maternal grandparents – the aforementioned Peter and his wife Agnes – and their aunt Petronilla as the only living male descendants of their family. Consequently, Andrew and Jakó became owners of Mihály and Tapolya (present-day Michalovce), Zalacska (Zalužice), Vinna (Vinné) and Tarna (Trnava pri Laborci, present-day all villages in Slovakia), in addition to the right of patronage over the Benedictine monastery of Kána. These donations laid the foundation of the wealthy Nagymihályi lordship in Ung and Zemplén counties for the upcoming century.

The brothers used their wealth to advance their social progress in the Hungarian royal court under the minor Ladislaus IV in the 1270s. Andrew is referred to as ispán of Ung County in 1273, when, together with Jakó, was granted the estates Sztára (today Staré) and Perecse (today a borough of Michalovce, Slovakia) in the county for their loyalty by the monarch. The royal charter narrates that both of them served Béla IV and Stephen V already faithfully. These lands were the basis of the emerging Nagymihályi lordship. Sometime in the last third of the 13th century, they built the castle of Nagymihály, a fortified stronghold in the region (present-day ruins, belongs to Vinné). It is possible that they also erected the nearby Barkó Castle (today ruins above Brekov) in the same period.

According to a royal charter of Ladislaus IV with the date February 1278, Andrew physically assaulted and beat the young monarch with a hooked stick (Latin: cambuca) during a harsh dispute. As a result, Ladislaus confiscated Jakóvár (lit. "Jakó's Castle") and its accessories near Meggyes in Szatmár County (present-day Medieșu Aurit, Romania) from Andrew because of his lese-majesty. Later, Ladislaus IV donated this castle and the surrounding lands to Nicholas Pok (otherwise, Andrew's future son-in-law). Early historians – e.g. Károly Szabó – saw another episode of the drastic weakening of royal power during the era of feudal anarchy In Andrew's serious audacity. However, later Hungarian historiography classified this document as non-authentic because its list of dignitaries reflects a political situation in 1274. Historian Péter Németh considered that "Jakó's Castle" never existed, and the fort was merely a fabrication compiled by members of the Meggyesi family (Nicholas Pok's descendants) during a late 14th-century lawsuit, as an identification with their fortified manor in Meggyes.

Both Andrew and Jakó took part in the Battle on the Marchfeld in August 1278. In 1279, Ladislaus IV confirmed Andrew and Jakó as the rightful owners of Sztára and Perecse. These data prove the falsity of the aforementioned document. In the same year, they were also granted the fort of Jeszenő (today Jasenov, Slovakia) with the surrounding forest as a "lost heritage". The Kaplons' centre, Nagymihály was granted right to hold fair. The brothers were involved in a lawsuit over the estate Gelyénes in Szatmár County (near present-day Satu Mare, Romania), which they eventually obtained. They sold the village Kerész (present-day a borough of Krišovská Liesková, Slovakia) in 1289. Both of them swore loyalty to Andrew III, who ascended the Hungarian throne in 1290. They participated in the 1291 Austrian–Hungarian War as military aides to the Hungarian king. They purchased the land Tiba (today Tibava, Slovakia) in Ung County for 300 marks from local castle warriors in 1290. Andrew III approved the contract in 1291. The brothers erected a small castle there ("Tibavára", today ruins near Podhoroď, Slovakia) around 1300. Andrew is last mentioned as a living person in 1302, when they possessed the land Gerecse (today a borough of Michalovce). His eldest son Lawrence is mentioned as the owner of the Kaplon possessions in his own right in 1307, implying that Andrew died by that time.

== Family ==
Andrew and his unidentified wife had at least five children. Through his sons, the Nagymihályi (also Ungi or Vinnai) kinship with its numerous branches descended from Andrew. Their eldest son Lawrence was progenitor of the Tibai, Sztáray (Sztárai) and Lucskai noble families. The second son Jakó (IV) was ancestor of the Bánfi de Nagymihály and Ödönfi de Nagymihály families. The Pongrácz de Nagymihály family descended from Michael, Andrew's third son. His daughter, Catherine was the second wife of the much older powerful lord Nicholas Pok, who dominated Szatmár County in the early 14th century. According to a late 14th-century forgery, Andrew donated several villages in Szatmár County (accessories to the alleged "Jakó's Castle") to his daughter and son-in-kaw as her dowry. They had no children. Catherine survived her husband and died sometime after 1331. Andrew's another daughter Anne married Peter Lipóci from the illustrious Aba clan.

== Sources ==
- Engel, Pál (1998). A nemesi társadalom a középkori Ung megyében [The Noble Society in Medieval Ung County] (in Hungarian). Társadalom- és művelődéstörténeti tanulmányok 25., MTA Történettudományi Intézete. ISBN 963-8312-59-9.
- Engel, Pál (1996). Magyarország világi archontológiája, 1301–1457, I. [Secular Archontology of Hungary, 1301–1457, Volume I] (in Hungarian). História, MTA Történettudományi Intézete. ISBN 963-8312-44-0.
- Karácsonyi, János (1901). A magyar nemzetségek a XIV. század közepéig. II. kötet [The Hungarian genera until the middle of the 14th century, Vol. 2] (in Hungarian). Hungarian Academy of Sciences.
- Németh, Péter (2008). A középkori Szatmár megye települései a 15. század elejéig [Settlements of the medieval Szatmár County until the early 15th century] (in Hungarian). Jósa András Múzeum Kiadványai 60. ISBN 978-963-7220-63-0.
- Zsoldos, Attila (2011). Magyarország világi archontológiája, 1000–1301 [Secular Archontology of Hungary, 1000–1301] (in Hungarian). História, MTA Történettudományi Intézete. ISBN 978-963-9627-38-3.
