= Jakó II Kaplon =

Hungarian nobleman

Jakó (II) Kaplon

Master of the cupbearers
- Reign: 1279–1280
- Predecessor: Julius Rátót
- Successor: Stephen Borsa
- Died: after 1311
- Noble family: gens Kaplon
- Issue: Andrew II; John I Ladislaus I Jakó III; Elizabeth a daughter
- Father: Jakó I
- Mother: Catherine N

Jakó (II) from the kindred Kaplon (Hungarian: Kaplon nembeli (II.) Jakó; died after 1311) was a Hungarian nobleman at the turn of the 13th and 14th centuries, who served as Master of the cupbearers from 1279 to 1280.

== Family ==
Jakó (or Jákó) was born into the Nagymihály branch of the ancient kindred Kaplon (also Kaplyon or Kaplony) as the son of Jakó (I), the first known member of the branch, who served as ispán of Zólyom County from 1243 to 1245 and in 1262. His mother was Catherine, the daughter of Peter, who himself was the son of Szoboszló and grandson of Apa, the Ban of Slavonia in the mid-12th century. Jakó (II) had a brother Andrew (I), who functioned as ispán of Ung County in 1273. Andrew was ancestor of the Nagymihályi, Sztáray (Sztárai), Tibai etc. noble families.

Jakó and his unidentified wife had at least six children. Neither of their four sons – Andrew (II), John (I), Ladislaus (I) and Jakó (III) – held court positions in the court of Charles I. Elizabeth married Thomas Szeretvai (grandson of File Szeretvai), then Nicholas Csicseri (son of Job Csicseri), while another unidentified daughter was the spouse of Thomas Kendi. Jakó's branch became extinct in 1449.

== Career ==
Initially, the clan Kaplon possessed landholdings primarily in Szatmár County, but the brothers Jakó and Andrew acquired estates in Ung and Zemplén counties too, through maternal inheritances. They are first mentioned in 1249 (albeit without names), when their maternal grandmother Agnes (spouse of the aforementioned Peter) donated her dower to them and her two daughters, Catherine (their mother) and Petronilla. The dower contained the estates Mihály and Tapolya (present-day Michalovce, Slovakia) with their accessories along the river Laborec (Laborc) and the forests near Zalacska (today Zalužice, Slovakia). Peter and Agnes donated another villages – Vinna (Vinné), Zalacska and Tarna (Trnava pri Laborci) – surrounding the aforementioned estates to their daughters still in that year. Béla IV confirmed the donations. The names of Jakó and his brother Andrew first appear in contemporary records in 1258, when their maternal aunt Petronilla bequeathed the right of patronage over the Benedictine monastery of Kána, in addition to her portions in the aforementioned villages, to them in her last will and testament.

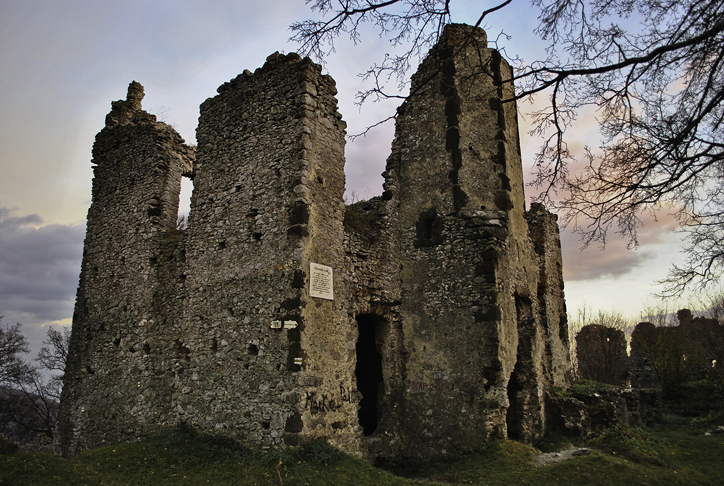
Vinné (Nagymihály) Castle, built by Jakó and Andrew Kaplon in the last decades of the 13th century

Jakó's career, together with Andrew, elevated during the first stage of the so-called feudal anarchy in the 1270s, when various baronial groups fought each other for the supreme power during the reign of the minor Ladislaus IV. Jakó was appointed ispán of Zemplén County in 1273. In that year, the brothers were granted the estates Sztára (today Staré) and Perecse (today a borough of Michalovce, Slovakia) in the county for their loyalty by Ladislaus IV. Jakó and Andrew began to establish Nagymihály lordship, an important centre of their estates in Ung County. Sometime in the last third of the 13th century, they built the castle of Nagymihály, a fortified stronghold in the region (present-day ruins, belongs to Vinné). It is possible that they also erected the nearby Barkó Castle (today ruins above Brekov, Slovakia) in the same period. In 1279, Ladislaus IV donated them the fort of Jeszenő (today Jasenov, Slovakia) with the surrounding forest as a "lost heritage" (the estate and the castle were possessed by Joachim Gutkeled prior to that). However, the castle was owned by Peter, son of Petenye after 1283. The Kaplons' centre, Nagymihály was granted right to hold fair.

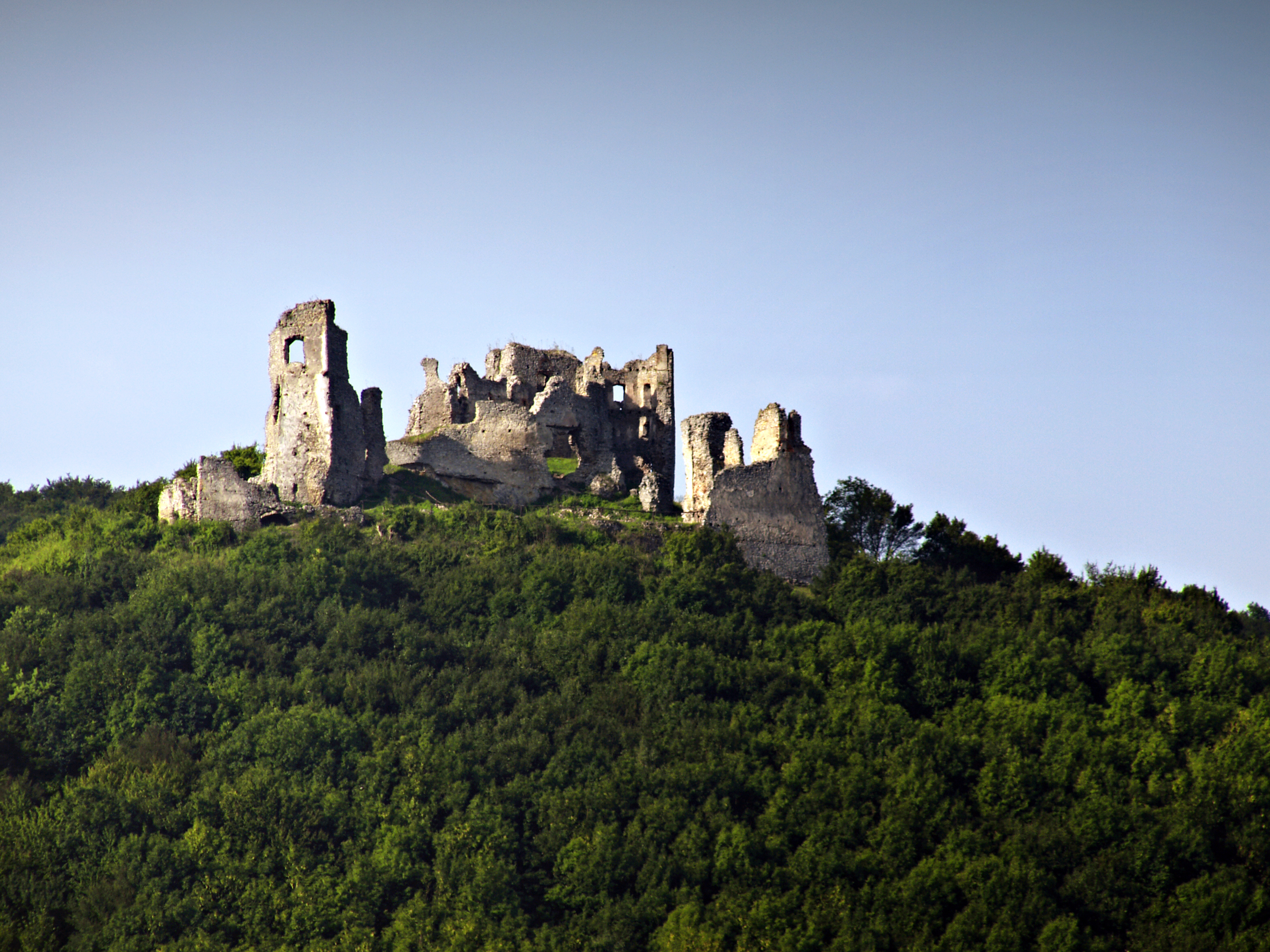
Brekov (Barkó) Castle, built by the Kaplon brothers in the late 13th century

Both Jakó and Andrew took part in the Battle on the Marchfeld in August 1278. As a result, Ladislaus confirmed the former royal donations to them. At the height of the internal political crisis, when both Ladislaus IV and papal legate Philip of Fermo were imprisoned, Jakó served as Master of the cupbearers at least from January 1279 to July 1280. During the latter, Jakó and Andrew were involved in a lawsuit with the influential Tekesh kinship over the estate Gelyénes in Szatmár County (near present-day Satu Mare, Romania), which they eventually obtained. They sold the village Kerész (present-day a borough of Krišovská Liesková, Slovakia) in 1289.

Both of them swore loyalty to Andrew III, who ascended the Hungarian throne in 1290. They participated in the 1291 Austrian–Hungarian War as military aides to the Hungarian king. In his court, Jakó again served as ispán of Zemplén County in 1299. Jakó and Andrew purchased the land Tiba (today Tibava, Slovakia) in Ung County for 300 marks from local castle warriors in 1290. Andrew III approved the contract in 1291. The brothers erected a small castle there ("Tibavára", today ruins near Podhoroď, Slovakia) around 1300. A certain Michael Budai contested their right of ownership over Sztára and Perecse, but abandoned his claim before a court's justice in 1291. Jakó donated a portion of his estate Sztára (called Felzubugya) to his two loyal familiares in 1301. Jakó and Andrew also possessed the land Gerecse (today a borough of Michalovce) by 1302.

Following the extinction of the Árpád dynasty and the era of Interregnum (1301–1310), Amadeus Aba, as a powerful oligarch, ruled de facto independently the north-eastern region of the Kingdom of Hungary, including Ung County. However, the Kaplons and their province, the Nagymihály lordship were able to maintain their independence. Jakó lost the castle of Barkó on the occasion of an exchange contract with Peter, son of Petenye in 1307. Jakó swore loyalty to Charles I by September 1308, when he was present in the royal court, when the monarch restored the church of Buda to its ecclesiastical rights. Jakó last appears as a living person in contemporary records in October 1311, when donated a possession in Zemplén County of his late son John (I) to his unidentified daughter and his son-in-law Thomas Kendi. It is plausible that he died shortly after. During the Abas' rebellion against Charles I, their troops commanded by Dominic Csicseri pillaged and occupied the castle of Tiba from the Kaplons.

== Sources ==
- Engel, Pál (1998). A nemesi társadalom a középkori Ung megyében [The Noble Society in Medieval Ung County] (in Hungarian). Társadalom- és művelődéstörténeti tanulmányok 25., MTA Történettudományi Intézete. ISBN 963-8312-59-9.
- Engel, Pál (1996). Magyarország világi archontológiája, 1301–1457, I. [Secular Archontology of Hungary, 1301–1457, Volume I] (in Hungarian). História, MTA Történettudományi Intézete. ISBN 963-8312-44-0.
- Karácsonyi, János (1901). A magyar nemzetségek a XIV. század közepéig. II. kötet [The Hungarian genera until the middle of the 14th century, Vol. 2] (in Hungarian). Hungarian Academy of Sciences.
- Kristó, Gyula (1999). "I. Károly király főúri elitje (1301–1309) [The Aristocratic Elite of King Charles I, 1301–1309]". Századok (in Hungarian). 133 (1). Magyar Történelmi Társulat: 41–62. ISSN 0039-8098.
- Zsoldos, Attila (2011). Magyarország világi archontológiája, 1000–1301 [Secular Archontology of Hungary, 1000–1301] (in Hungarian). História, MTA Történettudományi Intézete. ISBN 978-963-9627-38-3.

Jakó II Genus Kaplon Born: ? Died: after 1311
Political offices
Preceded by Julius Rátót	Master of the cupbearers 1279–1280	Succeeded by Stephen Borsa
