= Sztáray family =

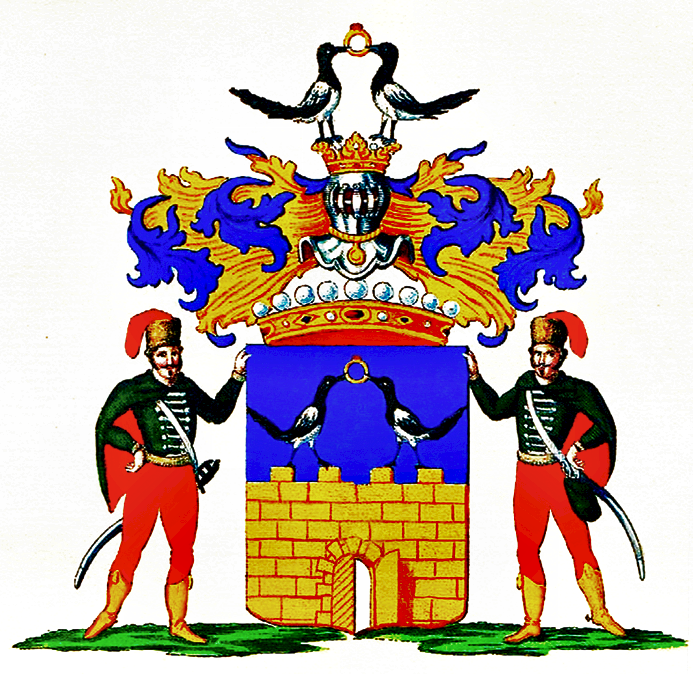
Coat of arms of the Sztáray family

The Sztáray family (counts of Nagymihály and Sztára) is an ancient Hungarian family, which takes its origin from the Kaplon genus.

== Origins ==
The first traceable ancestor of the family was Jákó, who lived around the first half of the 13th century, in the time of King Béla IV of Hungary. Jákó's wife was Kata Szoboszlai, from whom two sons are known: András, Lord-lieutenant of Ung County, and Jákó, Lord-lieutenant of Zemplén County and Master of the cupbearers.

The family received their Nagymihályi estate around 1249, and Sztára was given to them in 1273. The use of their old coat of arms was confirmed by King Sigismund on 29 March 1418.

The extant branch of the Sztáray family is descended from Lőrinc IV, son of András. The family became barons on 23 June 1725 and counts on 6 April 1747.

== Notable members ==
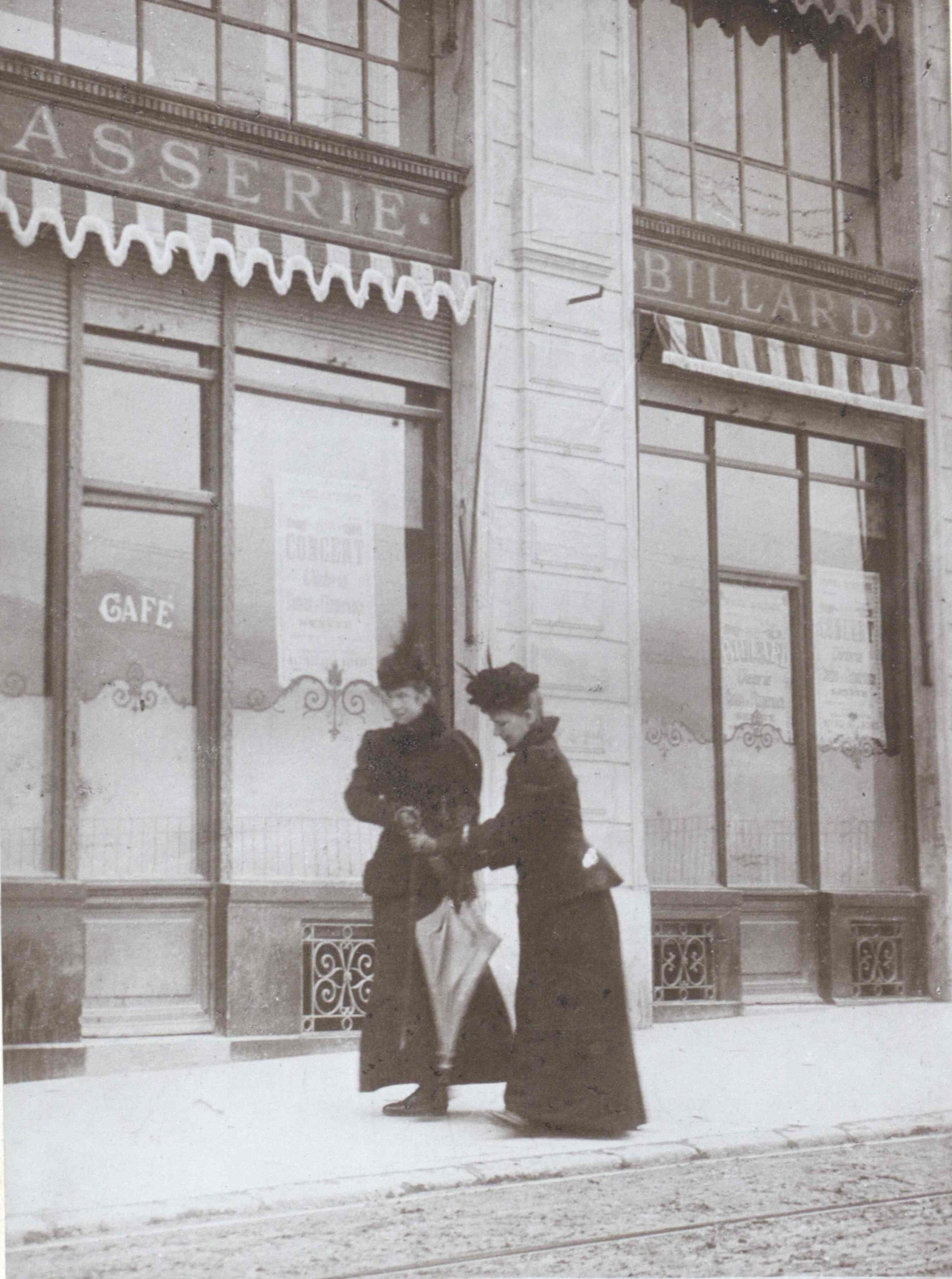
Last photograph taken of Empress Elisabeth of Austria-Hungary (at left) at Territet, Switzerland, with her lady in waiting, Countess Irma Sztáray.

Sources:

- Count Anton Sztáray (1740–1808) – decorated Habsburg military commander during the Austro-Turkish War (1788–1791), the French Revolutionary Wars, and the Napoleonic Wars
- Count Mihály Vincent Sztáray (1749–1798) – composer and violinist
- Count Albert Sztáray (1785–1843) – Conservative Party politician
  - Count Anton Sztáray (1839–1893) (son of Albert) – National Party politician
- Countess Irma Sztáray (1863–1940) – courtier and memoirist, lady-in-waiting of Empress Elisabeth of Austria, present during her assassination
- Count István Sztáray (1858–1896) – politician and diplomat, his murder is still unsolved
- Count János Nepomuk Sztáray (1840–1900) – politician and jockey

== Gallery ==
=== Properties (selection) ===
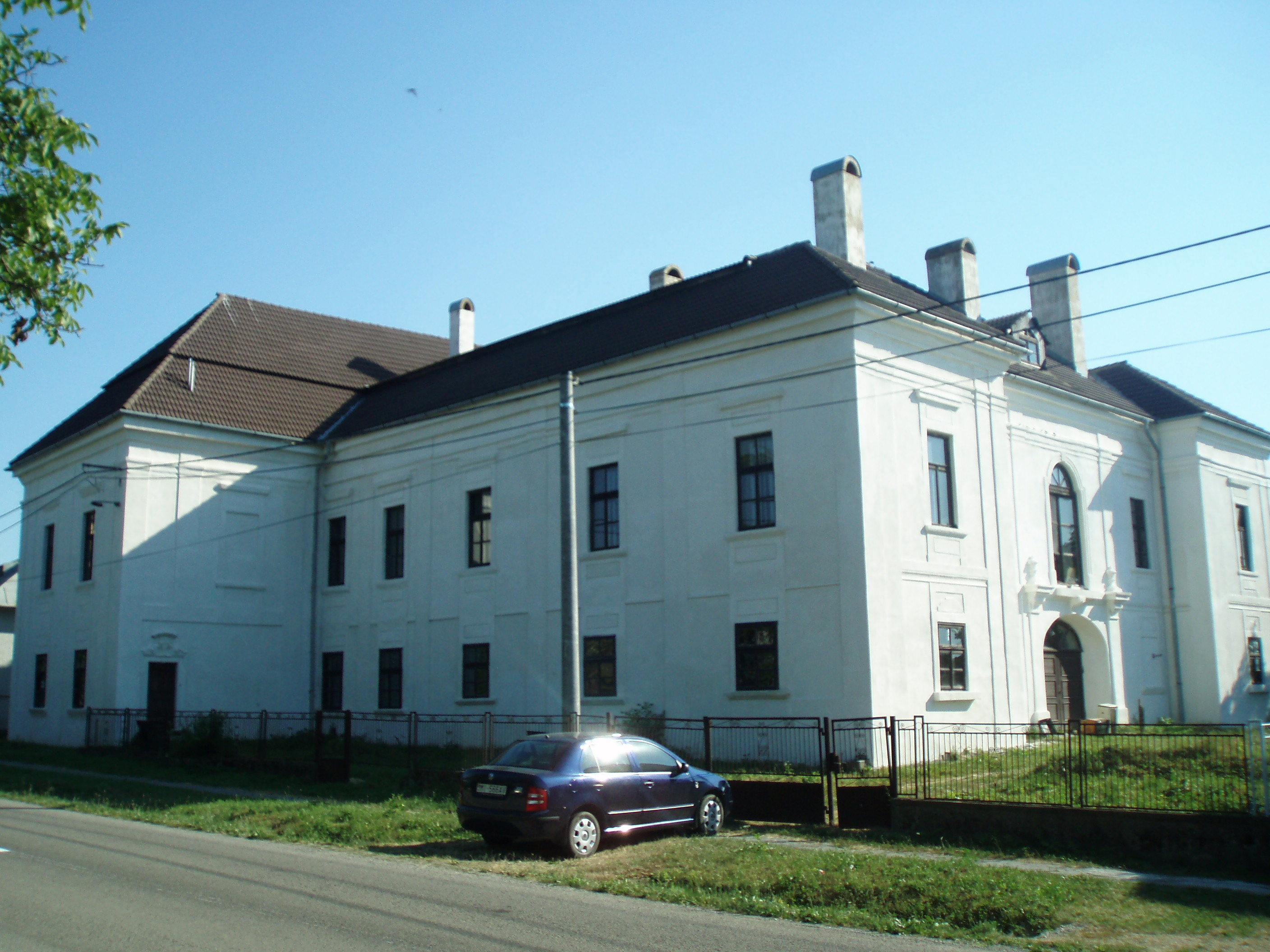
Manor house in Staré (Sztára), Slovakia, the Sztáray cadet branch's village of origin

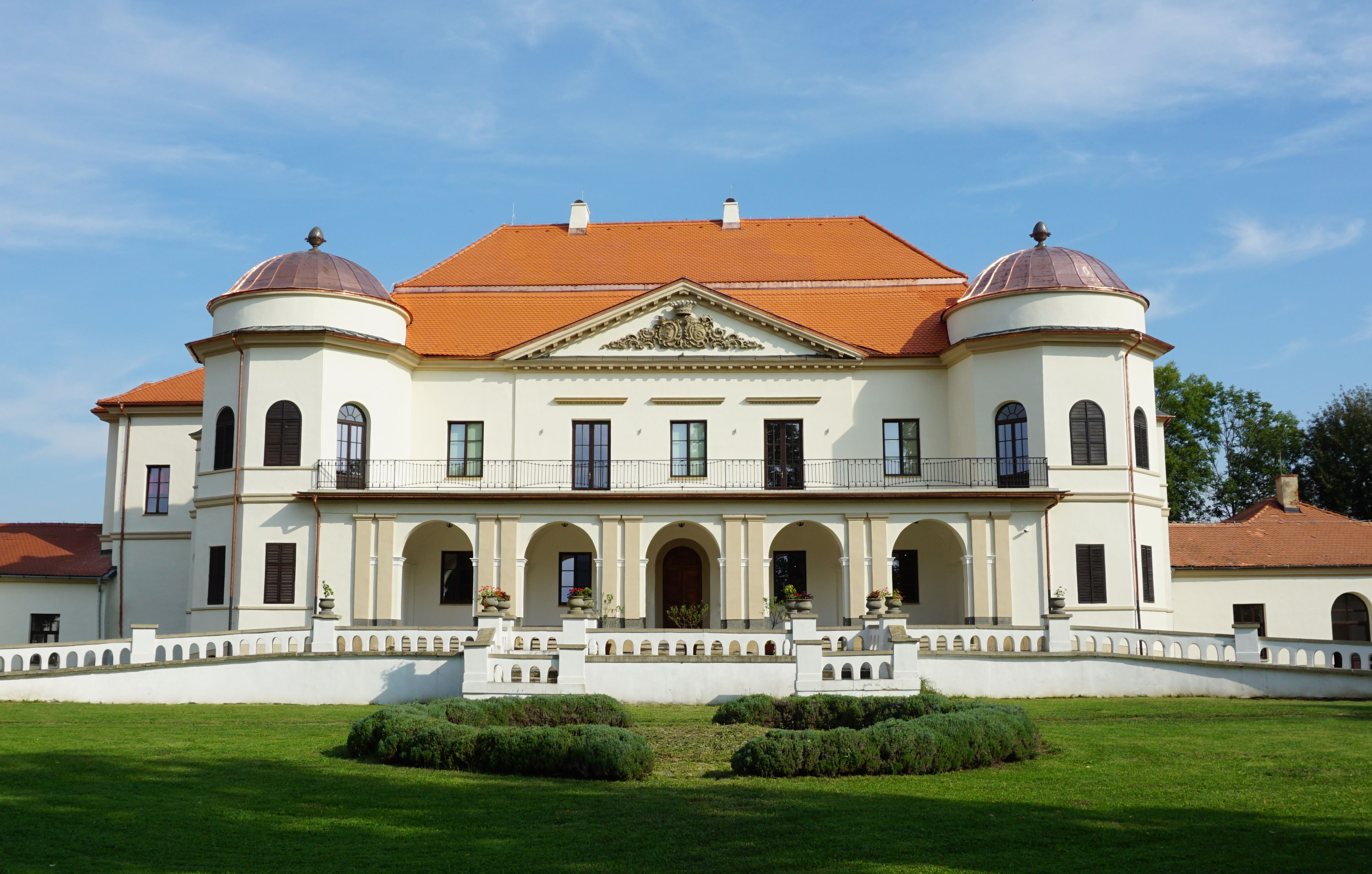
Manor house in Michalovce (Nagymihály), Slovakia, the main seat and home of the Sztáray family since the 18th century

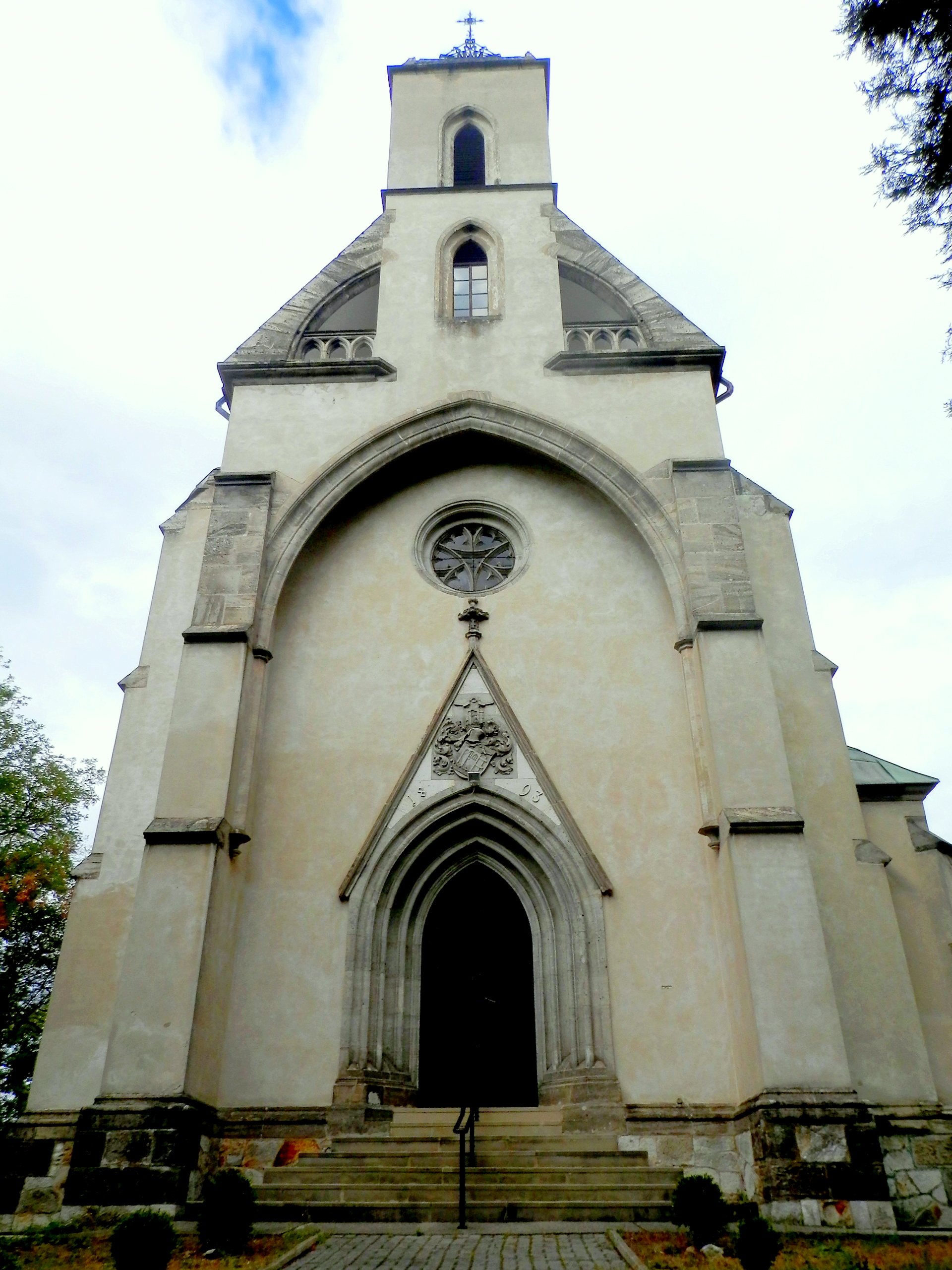
Gothic Revival Chapel of Saint Anthony of Padua, Michalovce, a Sztáray family chapel

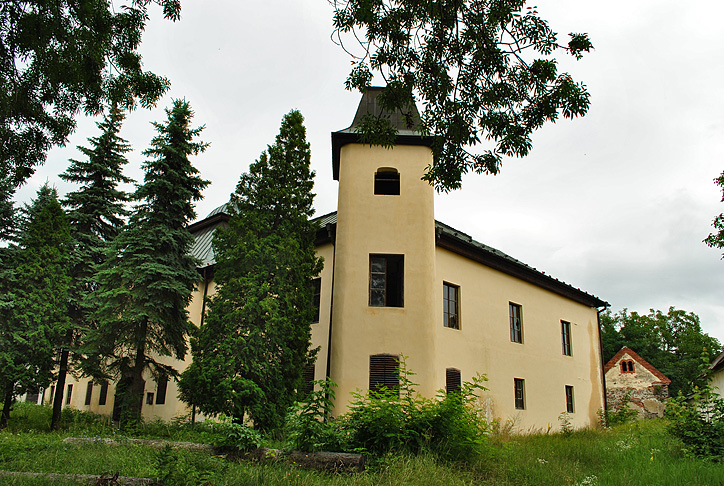
Manor house in Vinné (Vinna), Slovakia

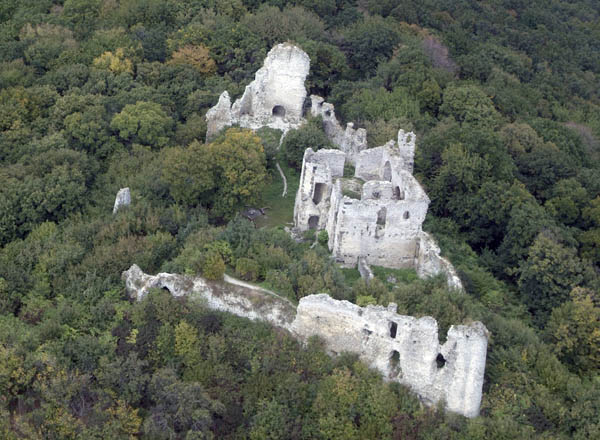
Castle in Vinné (Vinna), a Gothic-Renaissance era castle (a ruin since the early 18th century)

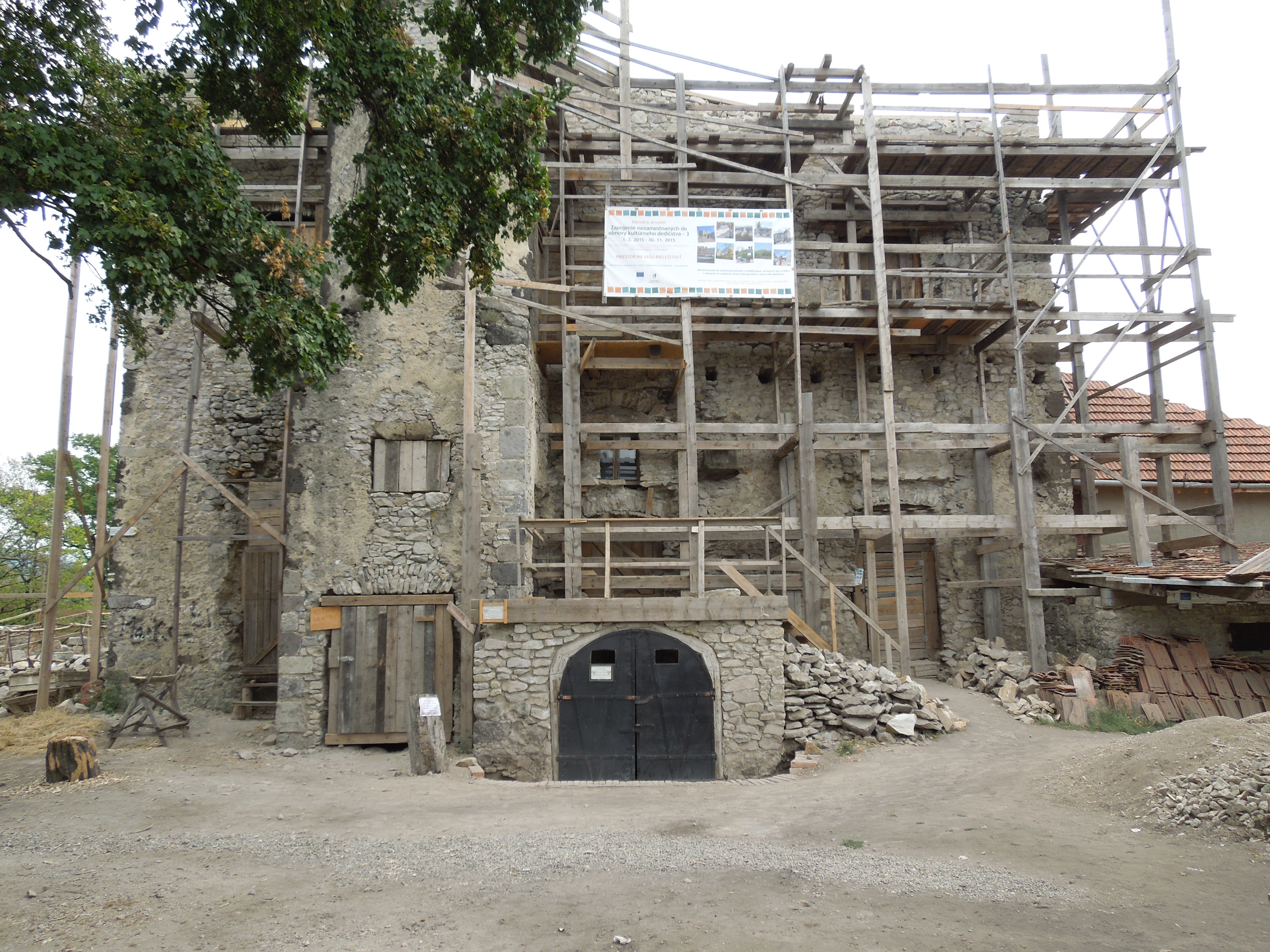
Vinné Castle undergoing restoration works by local historical association NGO (August 2015)

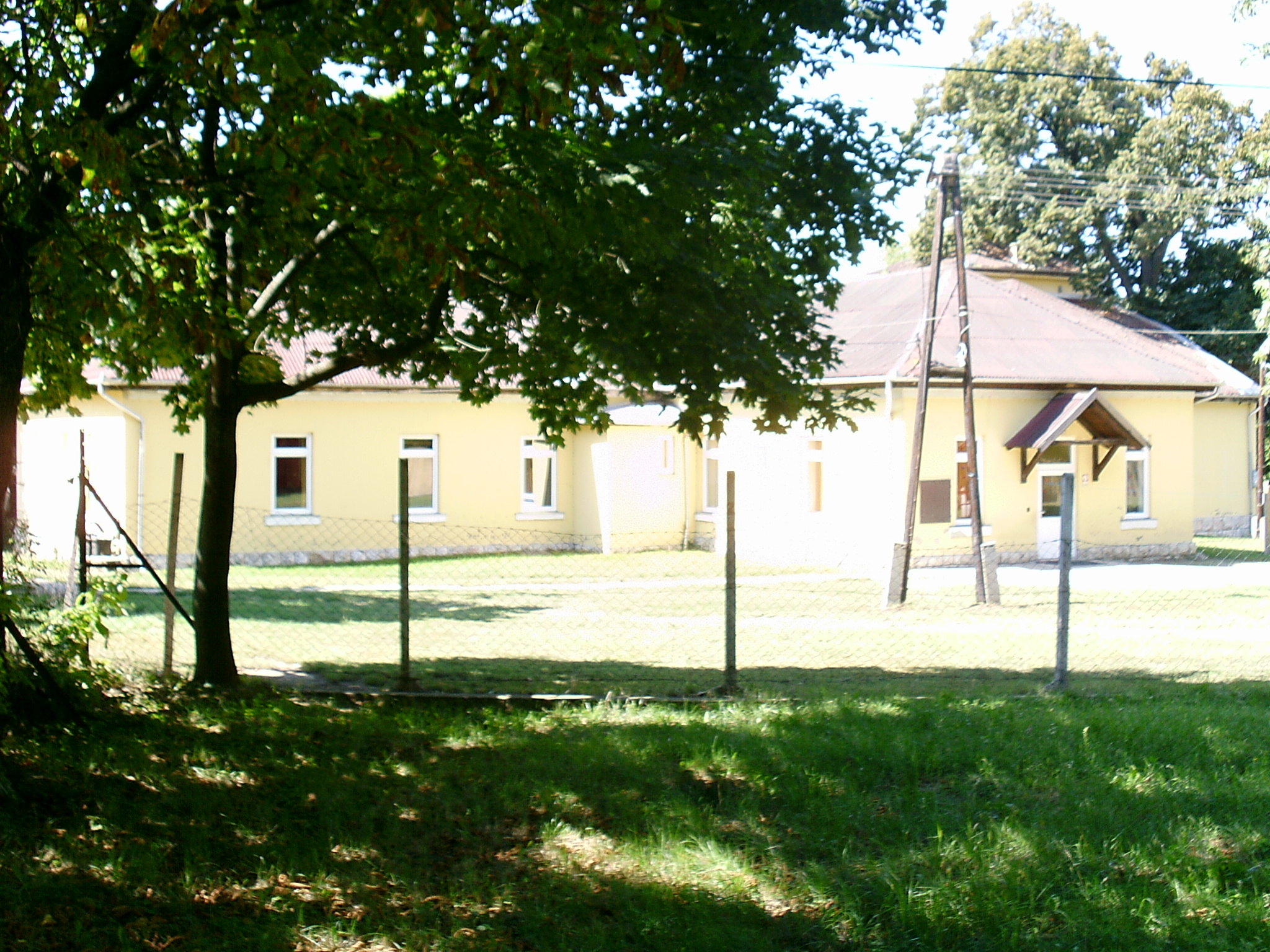
Manor house in Verpélet, Heves County, Hungary

=== Family heraldry ===
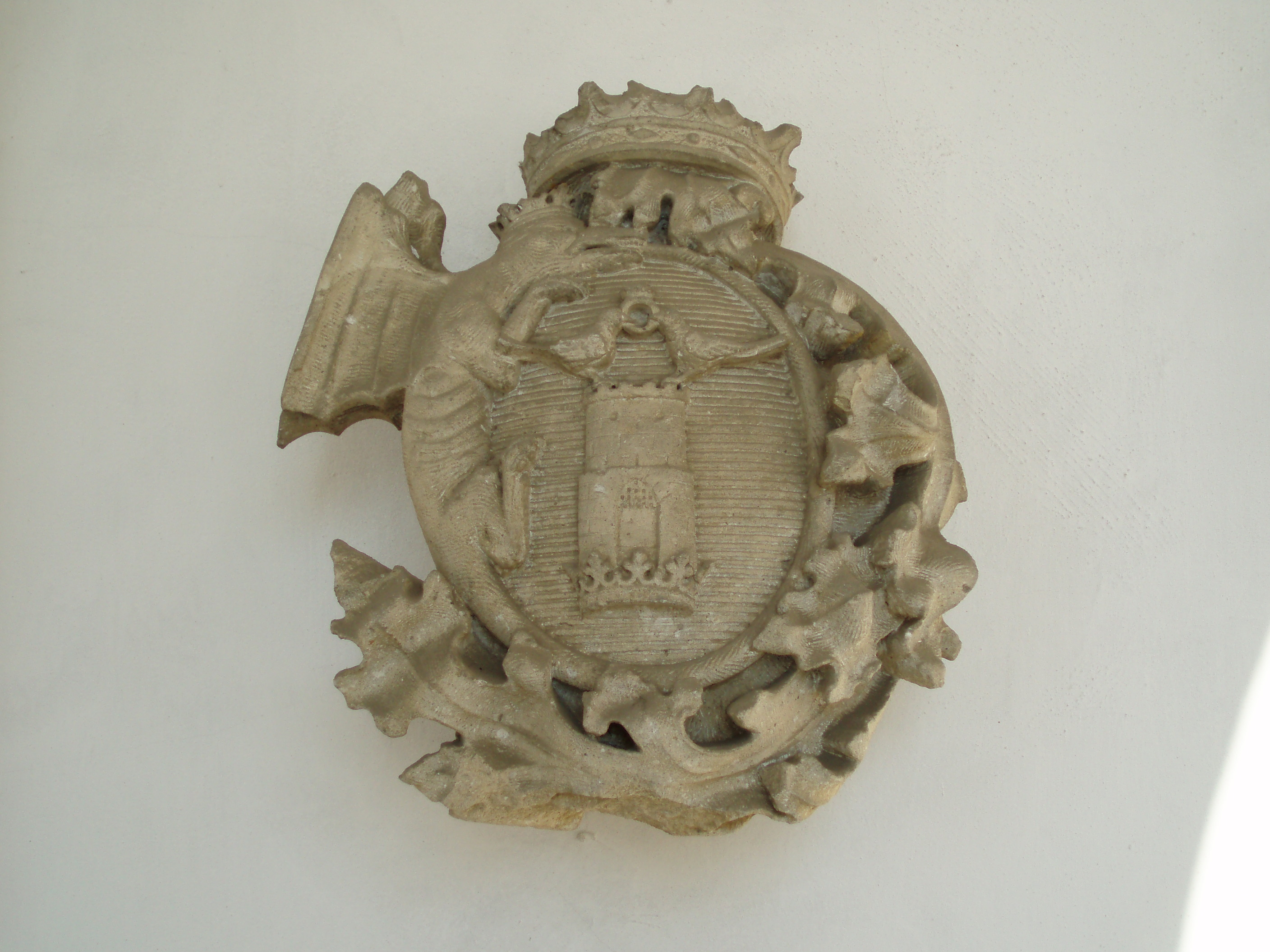
Stone relief Sztáray coat of arms displayed at the manor house in Michalovce / Nagymihály

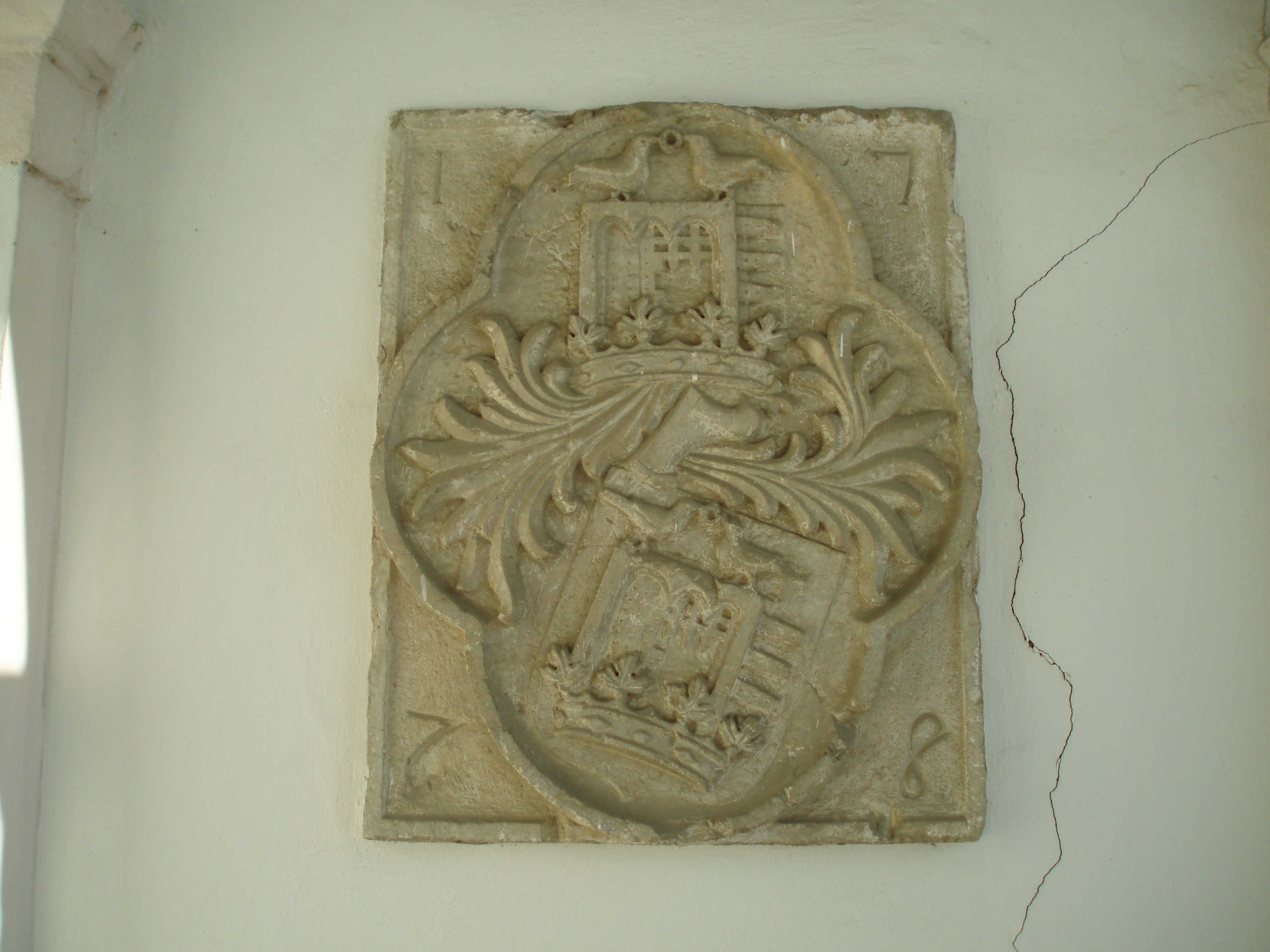
Stone relief Sztáray coat of arms displayed at the manor house in Michalovce / Nagymihály

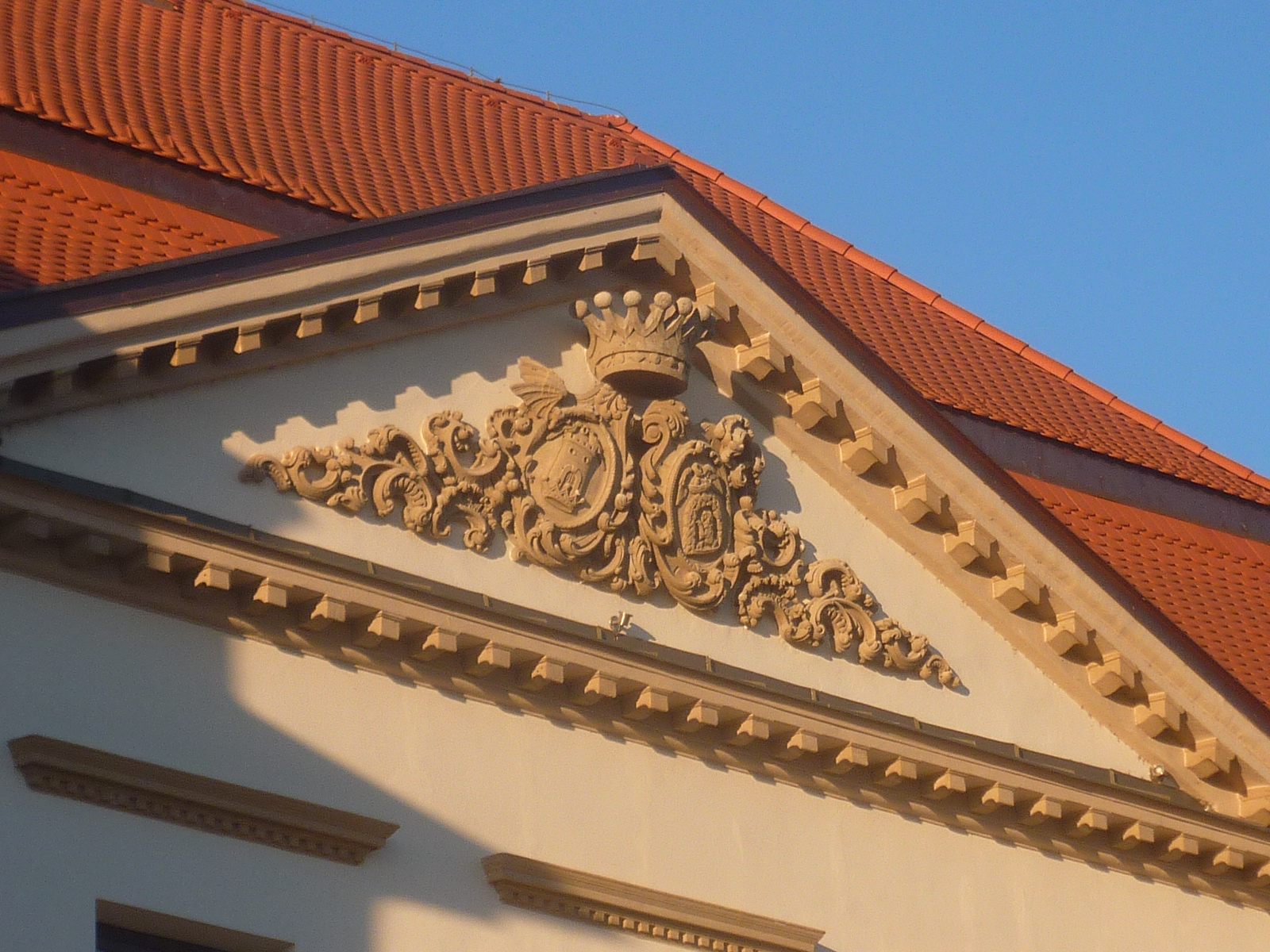
The pediment of the Michalovce manor house's front facade, with the coats of arms of count Antal Sztáray and his wife Franciska Sztáray, née Batthyány

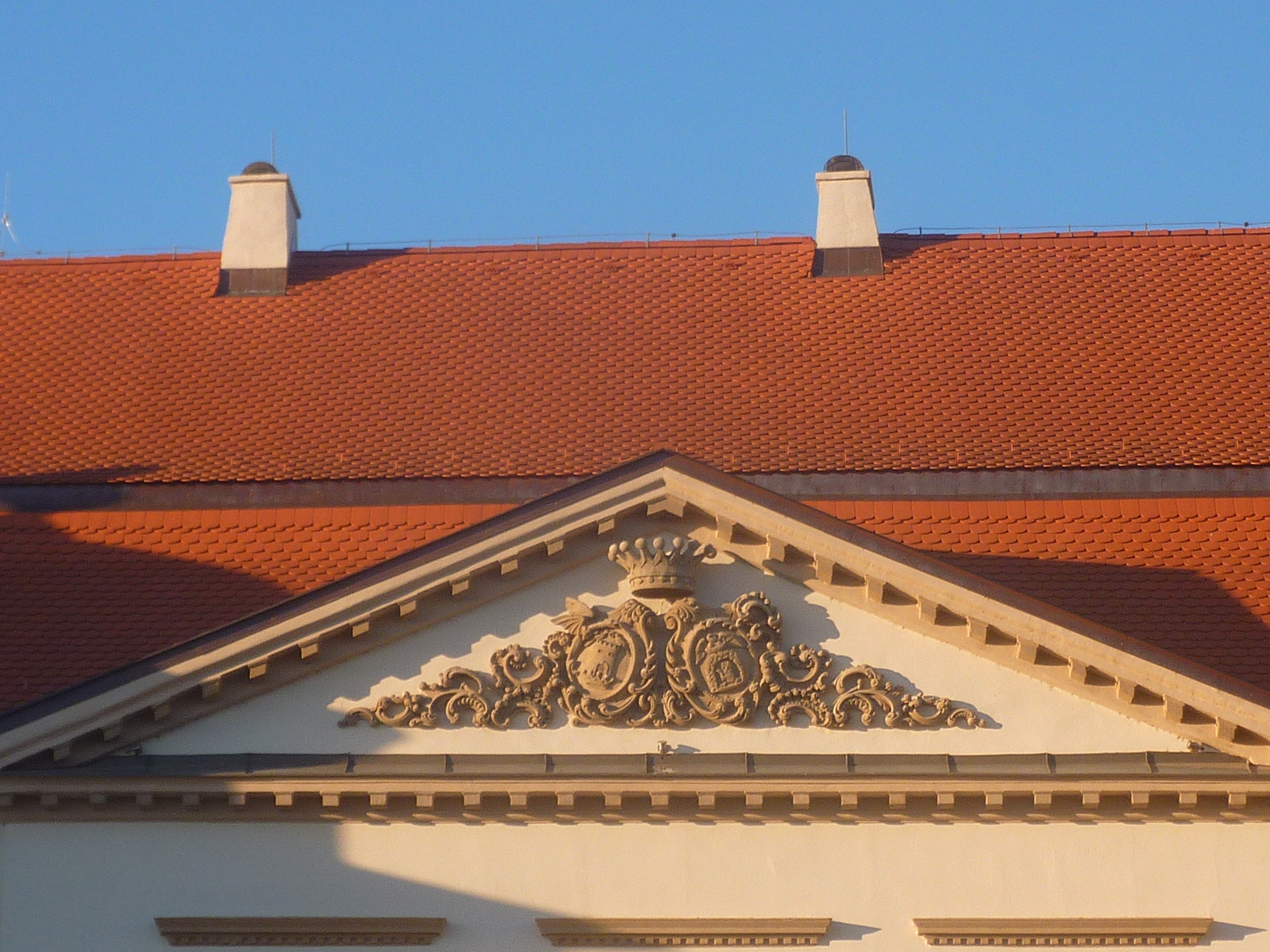
The pediment of the Michalovce manor house's front facade, with the coats of arms of count Antal Sztáray and his wife Franciska Sztáray, née Batthyány

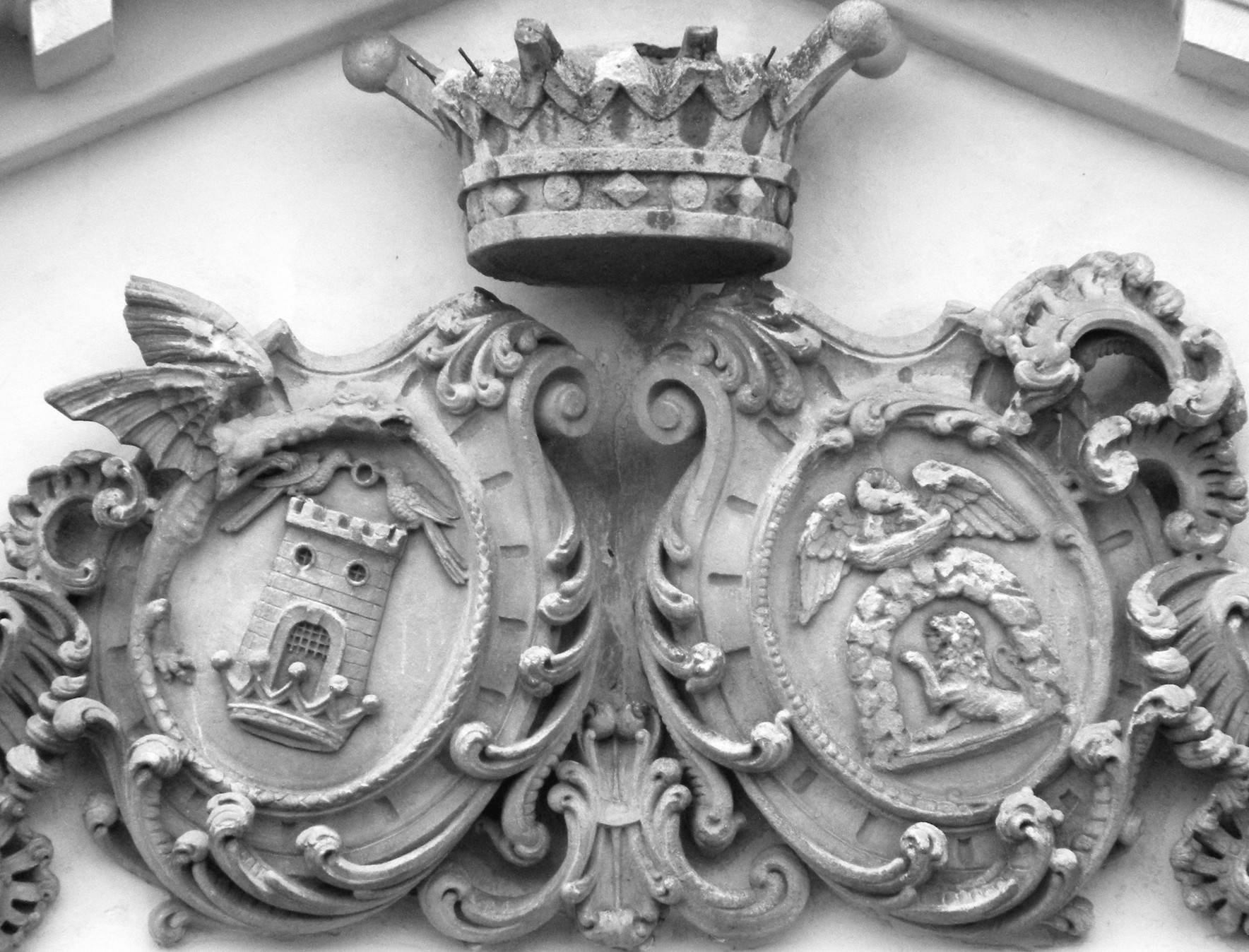
The pediment of the Michalovce manor house's front facade, with the coats of arms of count Antal Sztáray and his wife Franciska Batthyány (close-up)

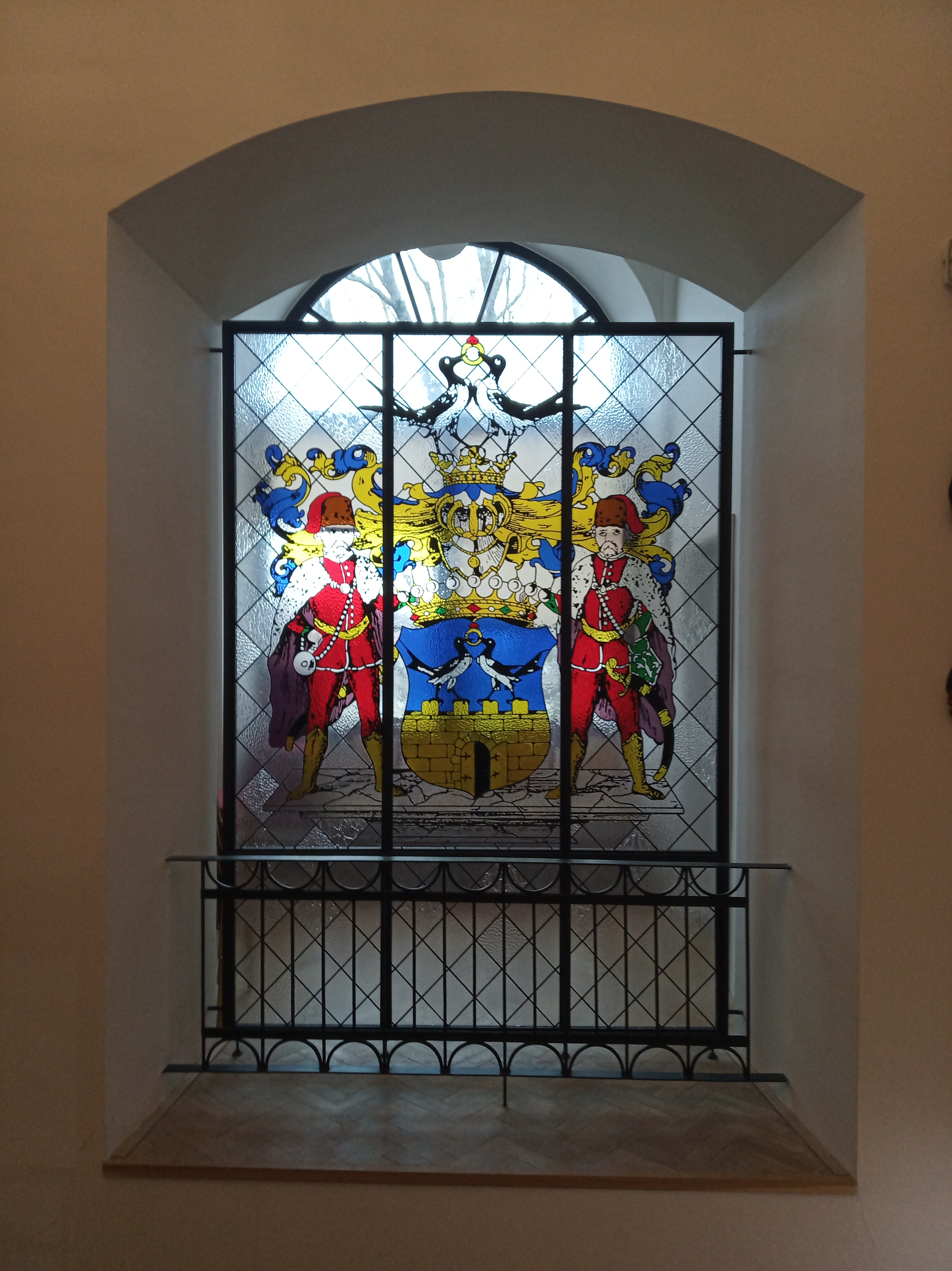
Stained glass window with the Sztáray noble family great coat of arms, inside the manor house in Michalovce, the Zemplín Museum

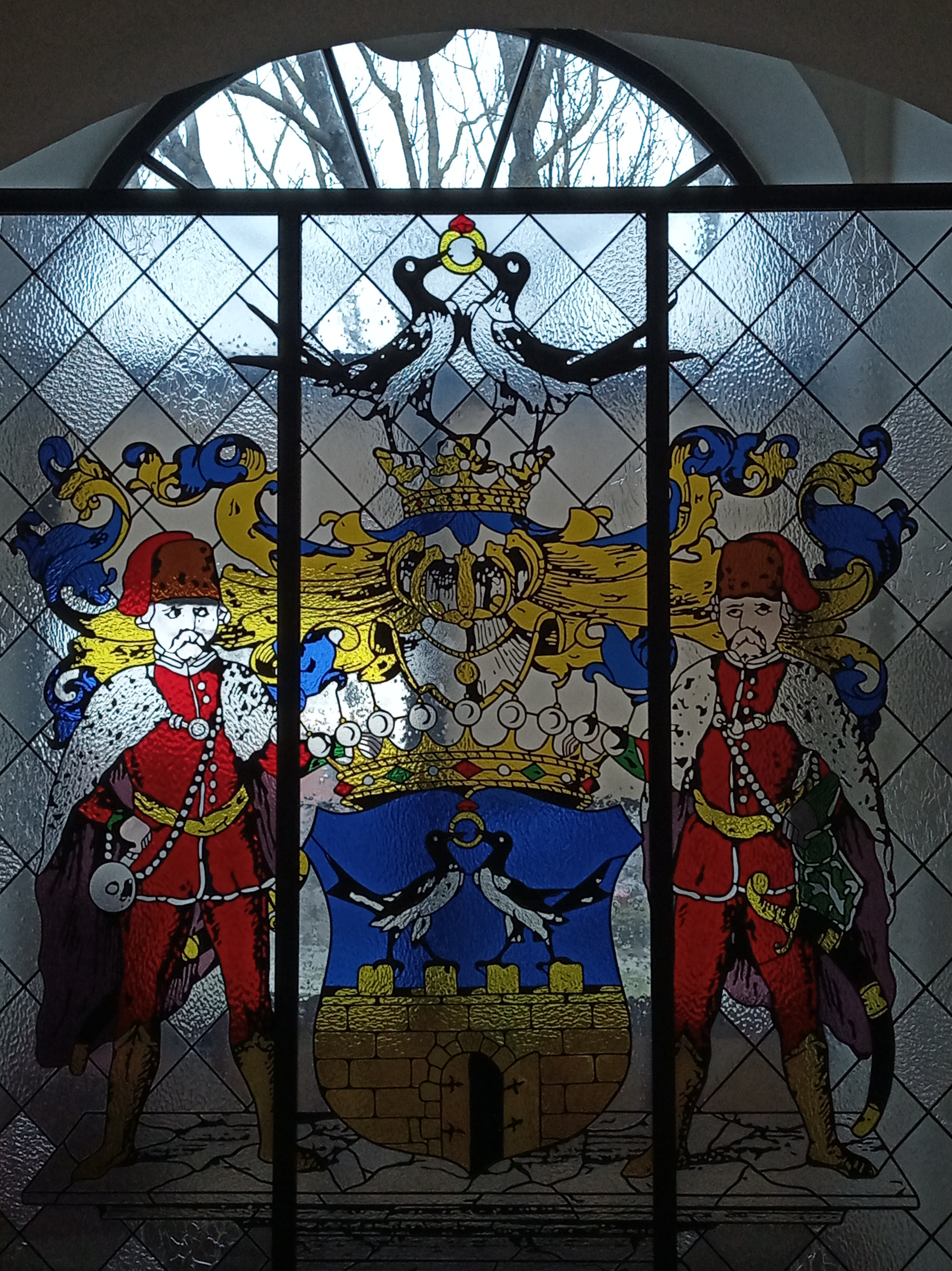
Stained glass window with the Sztáray noble family great coat of arms, inside the manor house in Michalovce, the Zemplín Museum

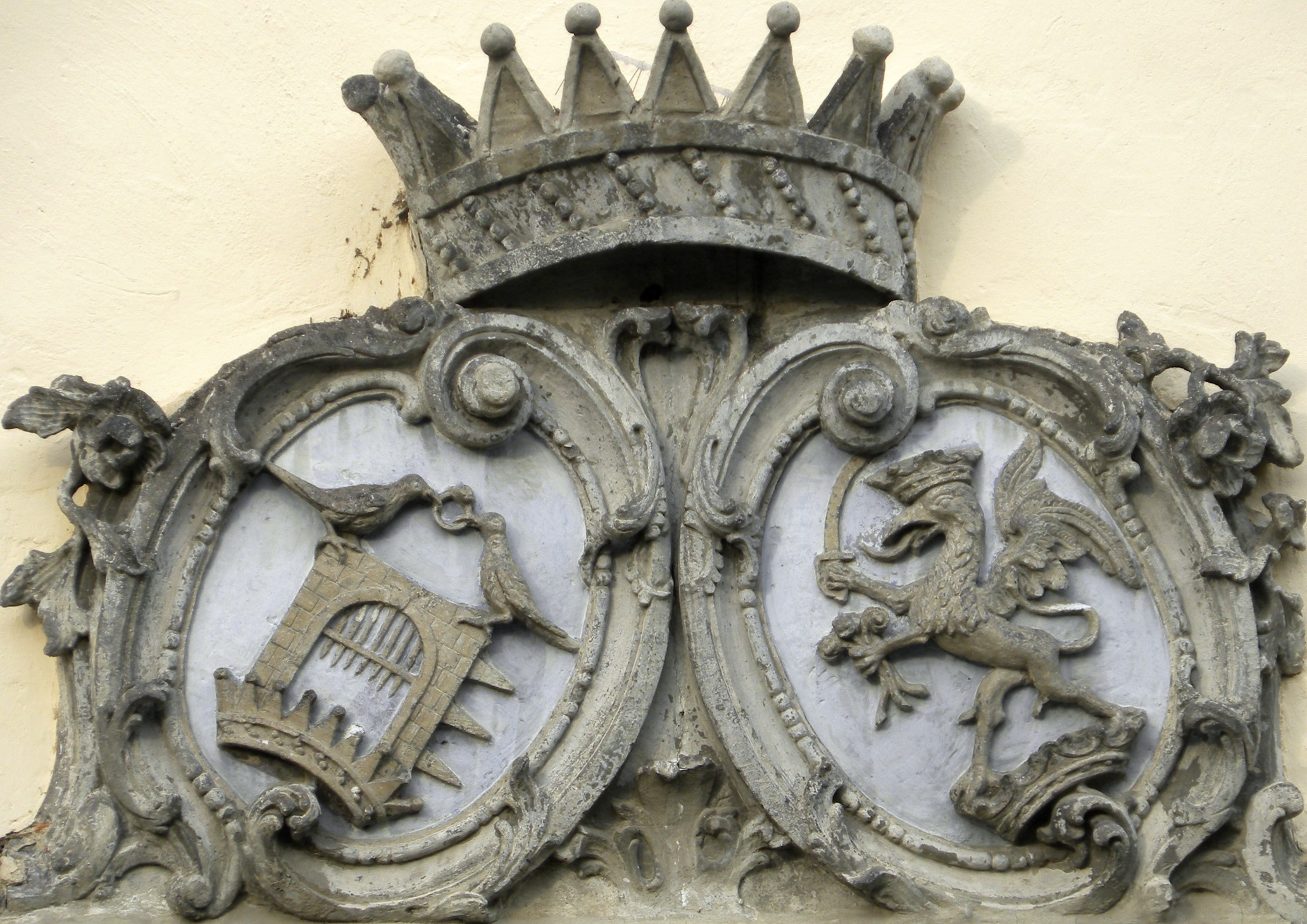
Stone relief coats of arms of Mihály/Michal Sztáray and his wife Eleonóra Sztáray, née Esterházy, above the entrance of the Roman Catholic parish church in Michalovce

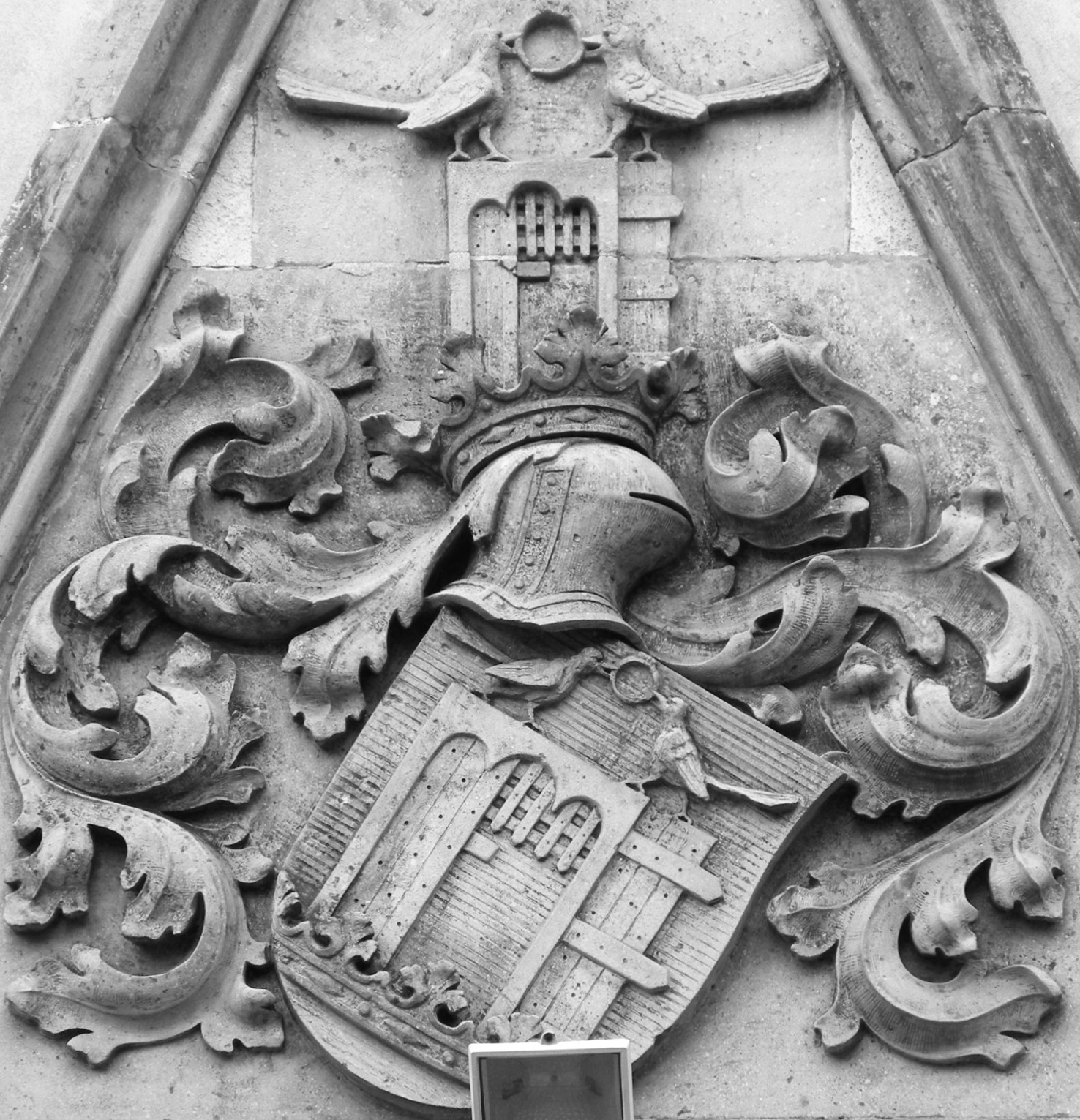
Stone relief coat of arms of Antal Sztáray, above the entrance of the Chapel of St. Anthony of Padua, Hrádok, Michalovce

=== Members of the Sztáray family ===
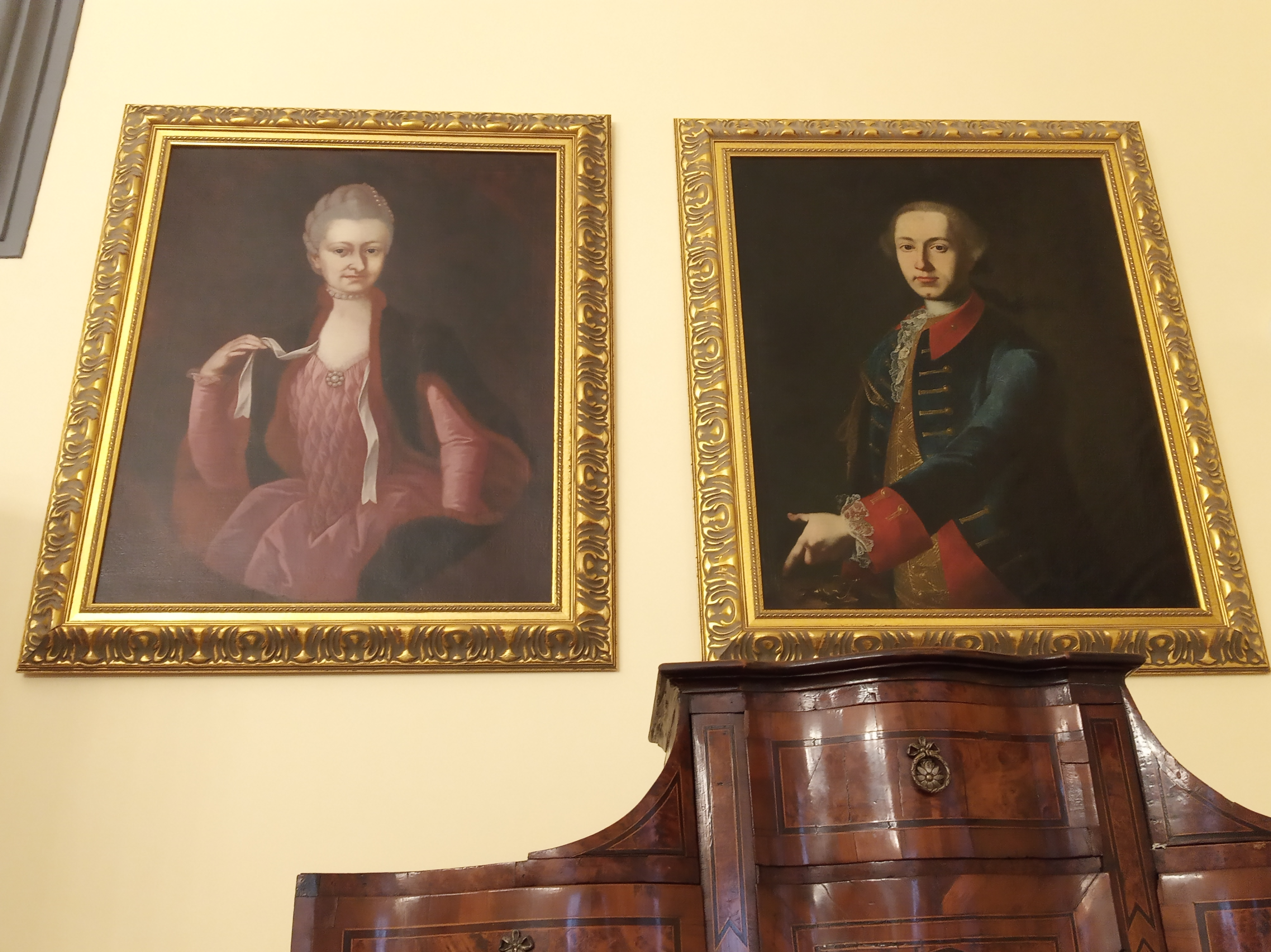
Countess Barbora Sztáray (née Migazzi) and count Vincent Sztáray, oil in canvas portraits from the 18th century, at the Zemplín Museum inside the Michalovce manor house

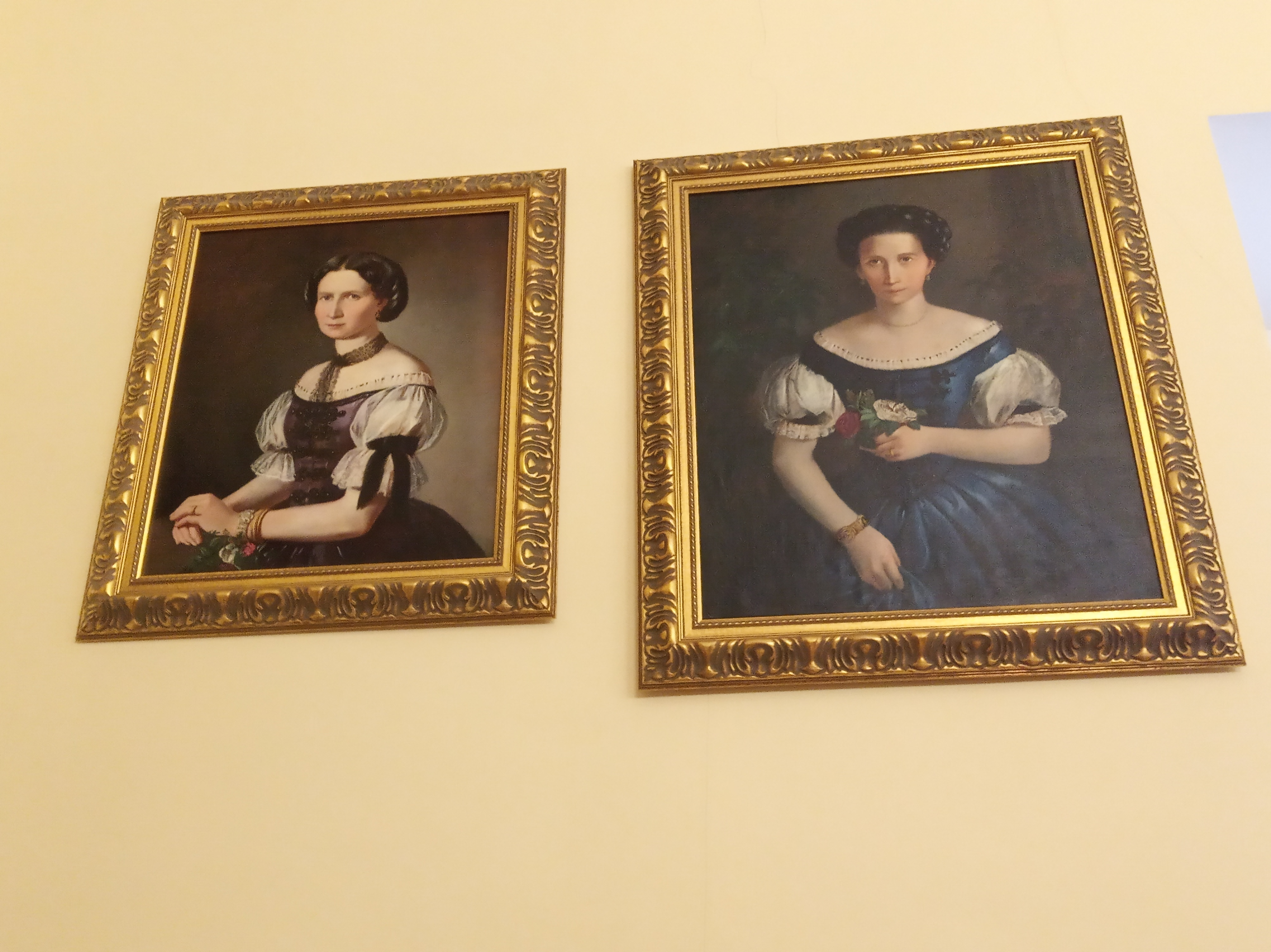
Oil on canvas portraits of countess Gabriela Sztáray (née Vécsey), 1850 (left) and 1860 (right), at the Zemplín Museum inside the Michalovce manor house

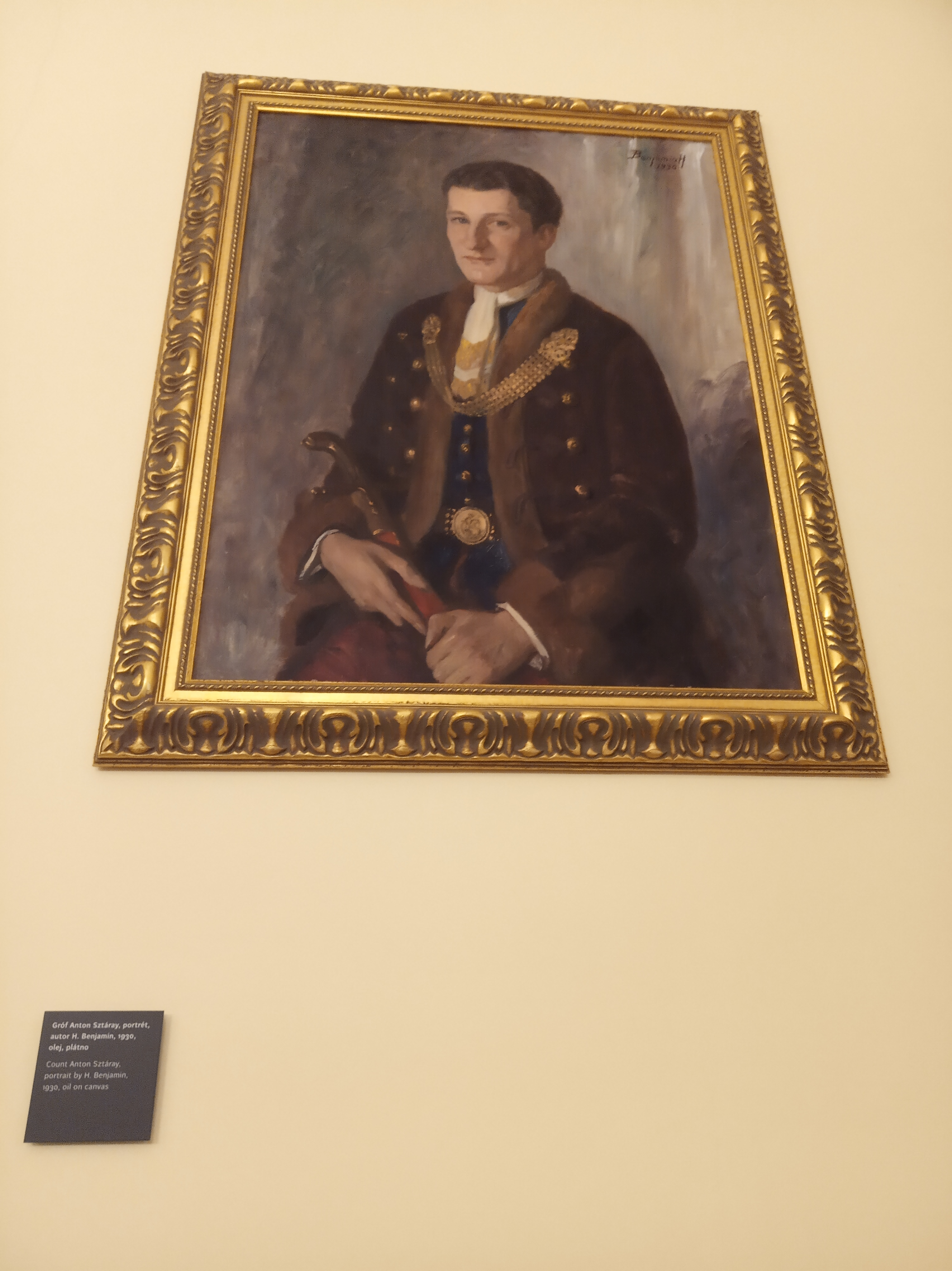
Count Anton Sztáray, oil on canvas portrait, 1930, at the Zemplín Museum inside the Michalovce manor house

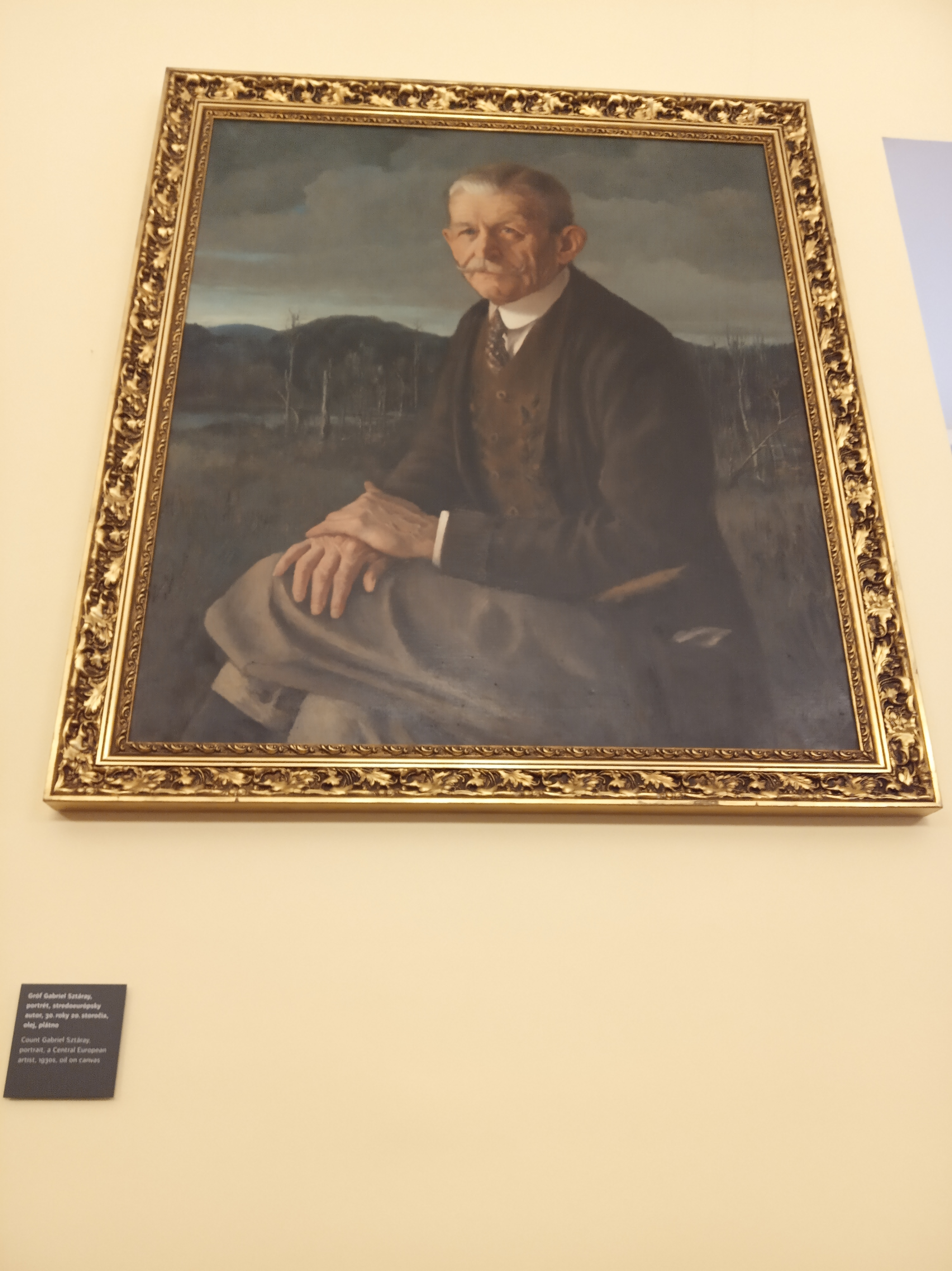
Count Gabriel Sztáray, oil on canvas portrait, 1930s, at the Zemplín Museum inside the Michalovce manor house

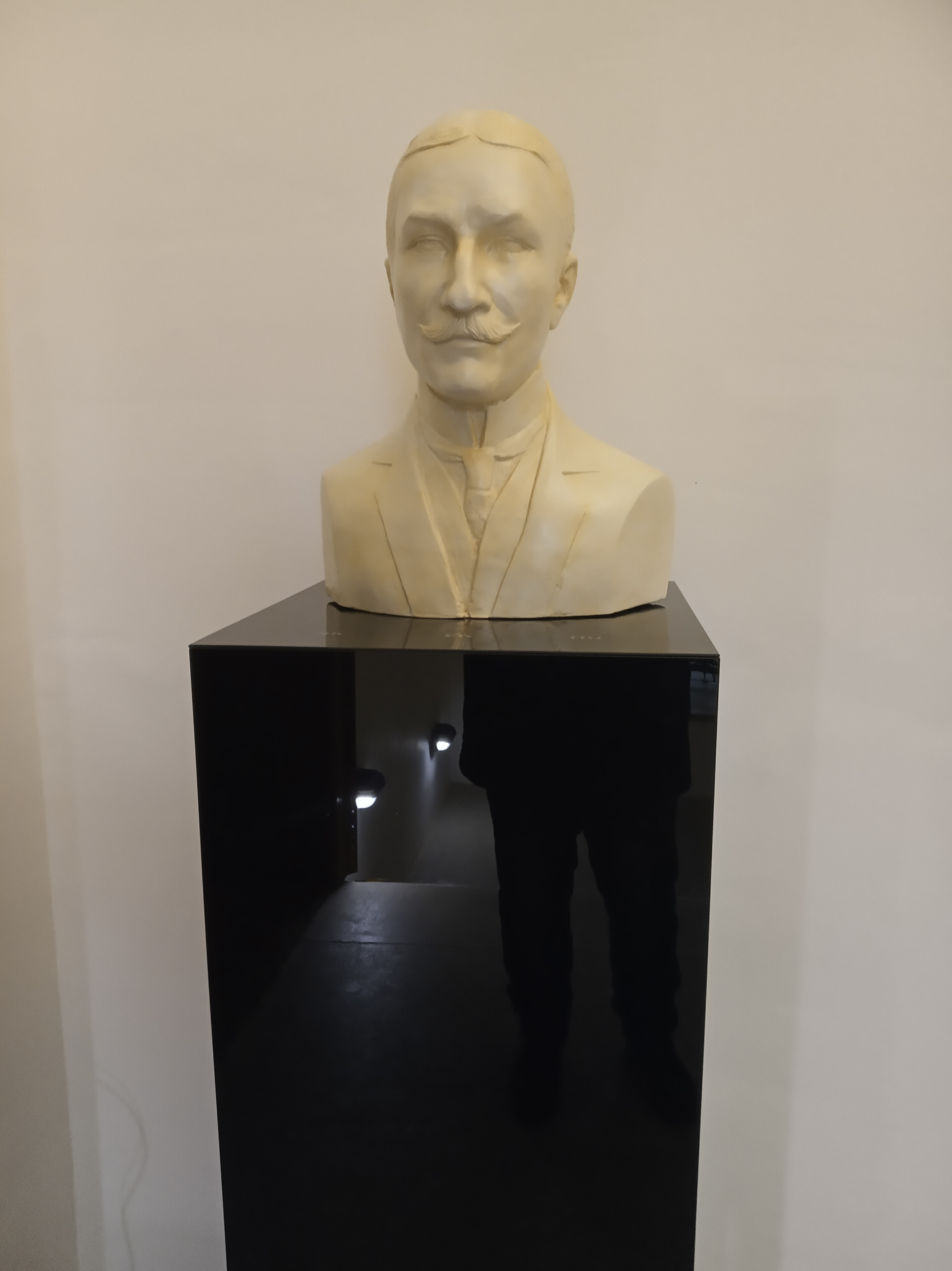
One of several busts of count Gabriel Sztáray at the Zemplín museum, providing opening audio commentary for permanent exhibitions

== Sources ==
- Kónya, Péter (2021). "A nagymihályi Sztáray grófi család és a Sztáray-uradalom felemelkedése a 18. században [The Family of the Sztáray Counts of Nagymihály (Michalovce) and the Rise of the Sztáray Demesne in the 18th century]". In Egyed, Emese; Pakó, László; Sófalvi, Emese; Weisz, Attila (eds.). CERTAMEN VIII. Előadások a Magyar Tudomány Napján az Erdélyi Múzeum–Egyesület I. Szakosztályában (in Hungarian). Erdélyi Múzeum Egyesület. pp. 111–119. ISSN 2393-4328.
