= Apa of Slavonia =

Hungarian nobleman

Apa

Ban of Slavonia
- Reign: 1157–1158
- Predecessor: Beloš
- Successor: Ampud (?)
- Died: after 1161
- Issue: Szoboszló

Apa or Appa (also Alban; died after 1161) was a nobleman in the Kingdom of Hungary in the second half of the 12th century, who held courtly positions and elevated into the dignity of Ban of Slavonia during the last period of the reign of Géza II of Hungary.

== Ancestry ==
His origin is unknown, but his brother was the powerful and well-educated prelate, Lucas, Archbishop of Esztergom. According to Mór Wertner, Apa's namesake father was that Apa, who was referred one of the powerful lords in 1108, during the reign of Coloman the Learned. From the 18th century onwards, several historians and genealogists attempted to connect Apa and Lucas to various notable genera (clans) in the Kingdom of Hungary, mostly the illustrious Gutkeled clan. Historian Ubul Kállay argued Apa and Lucas were the sons of Alexius Gutkeled, a Ban of Slavonia during the reign of Stephen II of Hungary.

== Career ==
Apa was first mentioned by contemporary records in 1148, when he was already referred to as a comes by a privilege letter of Géza II. He was styled as "apud regem gratiosissimus" in 1150, reflecting his distinguished status in the royal court by that time. He functioned as ispán of Bodrog County in 1156, but it is possible he already held the dignity from the previous decade, when he was frequently mentioned as comes (or ispán) without the specific county. The brothers – Apa and Lucas – came to prominence after the departure of King Géza's maternal uncle, Beloš, who became disgraced at the royal court and fled Hungary in late 1157. As his successor, Apa was made Ban of Slavonia. It is plausible he bore the dignity until Géza's death in 1162. In this capacity, he governed the Dalmatian coastal region (Croatian Littoral or Primorje), and the area between the rivers Drava and Sava still did not fall under his jurisdiction. As there is no known office-holder of the dignity Palatine of Hungary in the last years of Géza II, it is possible that Apa was the most powerful secular confidant of the monarch after Beloš' departure, while Lucas was elevated into the archbishopric of Esztergom, becoming head of the Church in Hungary in the same time.

According to a non-authentic charter, he also served as Judge royal (Latin: curialis comes maior) in 1158. The charter also refers to a certain Emeric, who bore the title of "curialis comes minor", which is a possible first mention of the office of vice-judge royal. Ban Apa possessed lands in the northeastern part of Hungary, mostly Ung and Zemplén counties. He owned the village of Kána (present-day archaeological ruins in Budapest). He erected a Benedictine abbey there.

According to a decretal of Pope Alexander III, when the papal legate, cardinal Pietro di Miso was sent to Hungary to hand over the pallium to Lucas of Esztergom in 1161, the archbishop's brother "Alban" (most scholars identified him with Apa) provided a horse for the legate, when Pietro and his escort entered the Hungarian border via Dalmatia (thus Apa perhaps still functioned as ban in that year). The letter narrates that Archbishop Lucas worried this step could be considered as simony in the Roman Curia. Pope Alexander reassured the prelate with Biblical phrases. This is the last mention of Apa as a living person.

== Family ==
Apa had a son Szoboszló (Sobéslav), who had two sons Peter and Gotthard. Both of them died without male descendants. Peter's wife was a certain Agnes. In 1244, Peter bequeathed his estate Reviscse (present-day Blatné Revištia, Slovakia) to his daughter Catherine, who was the wife of Jakó (I) Kaplon. They were progenitors of the Nagymihályi, Sztáray (Sztárai) and Tibai noble families, among others. In 1248, Peter handed over the dower to his wife Agnes, which contained the estates Mihály and Tapolya (present-day Michalovce, Slovakia) with their accessories along the river Laborec (Laborc) and the forests near Zalacska (today Zalužice, Slovakia). In the next year, Agnes donated these estates to their daughters and grandsons, establishing the Nagymihály lordship, an important fortune of the Kaplon clan. Peter had another daughter, Petronilla, who was the spouse of Philip, the ispán of Pilis County from 1251 to 1262. She compiled her last will and testament in 1258, in which she bequeathed the right of patronage over the Kána monastery to the sons of Catherine, Andrew (I) and Jakó (II) Kaplon.

== Sources ==
- Engel, Pál (1998). A nemesi társadalom a középkori Ung megyében [The Noble Society in Medieval Ung County] (in Hungarian). Társadalom- és művelődéstörténeti tanulmányok 25., MTA Történettudományi Intézete. ISBN 963-8312-59-9.
- F. Romhányi, Beatrix (2000). Kolostorok és társaskáptalanok a középkori Magyarországon: Katalógus [Monasteries and Collegiate Chapters in Medieval Hungary: A Catalogue] (in Hungarian). Pytheas. ISBN 963-7483-07-1.
- Körmendi, Tamás (2003). "Lukács [Lucas]". In Beke, Margit (ed.). Esztergomi érsekek 1001–2003 [Archbishops of Esztergom 1001–2003] (in Hungarian). Szent István Társulat. pp. 59–72. ISBN 963-361-472-4.
- Markó, László (2006). A magyar állam főméltóságai Szent Istvántól napjainkig: Életrajzi Lexikon [Great Officers of State in Hungary from King Saint Stephen to Our Days: A Biographical Encyclopedia] (in Hungarian). Helikon Kiadó. ISBN 963-547-085-1.
- Thoroczkay, Gábor, ed. (2018). Írott források az 1116–1205 közötti magyar történelemről [Written Sources of the Hungarian History between 1116 and 1205] (in Hungarian). Szegedi Középkorász Műhely. ISBN 978-615-80398-3-3.
- Zsoldos, Attila (2011). Magyarország világi archontológiája, 1000–1301 [Secular Archontology of Hungary, 1000–1301] (in Hungarian). História, MTA Történettudományi Intézete. ISBN 978-963-9627-38-3.

Political offices
| Preceded by Beloš | Ban of Slavonia; 1157–1158 | Succeeded by Ampud (?) |
| Preceded by Héder | Judge royal uncertain 1158 | Succeeded by Gabriel |
