= Jakó I Kaplon =

Hungarian nobleman

Jakó (I) Kaplon

Ispán of Zólyom
- Reign: 1243–1245; 1263
- Predecessor: Derek I Balassa (1st term); Derek II Balassa (2nd term)
- Successor: Mikó Balassa (1st term); Michael Balassa (2nd term)
- Died: after 1263
- Noble family: gens Kaplon
- Spouse: Catherine N
- Issue: Andrew I Jakó II

Jakó (I) from the kindred Kaplon (Hungarian: Kaplon nembeli (I.) Jakó; died after 1263) was a Hungarian nobleman in the 13th century, who served as ispán of Zólyom County from 1243 to 1245 and in 1263. He was progenitor of various noble families, including the Sztáray family.

== Family and career ==
Jakó (or Jákó) originated from the ancient Hungarian kindred Kaplon (also Kaplyon or Kaplony). According to the tradition, the clan descended from Kond, one of the seven chieftains of the Magyars during the conquest of the Carpathian Basin in the late 9th century. Jakó's parentage is unknown, thus he is the first member of the kindred's so-called Nagymihály branch, which possessed landholdings in Szatmár County.

Jakó was ispán of Zólyom County from 1243 to 1245. According to a non-authentic charter with the date 1274, Jakó built a castle called Jakóvár (lit. "Jakó's Castle"), which was later called Meggyes, near present-day Medieșu Aurit. Historian Péter Németh considered that this castle never existed, and the fort was merely a fabrication compiled by members of the Meggyesi family during a late 14th-century lawsuit, as an identification with their fortified manor in Meggyes. Jakó was again ispán of Zólyom County in 1263.

Jakó married Catherine, a great-granddaughter of Apa, who was a ban of Slavonia in the mid-12th century. Through this marriage, Jakó's branch acquired several landholdings in Ung and Zemplén counties, since Peter, Catherine's father had no male descendants. In 1244, Peter bequeathed his estate Reviscse (present-day Blatné Revištia, Slovakia) to Jakó's wife. In 1248, Peter handed over the dower to his wife Agnes, which contained the estates Mihály and Tapolya (present-day Michalovce, Slovakia) with their accessories along the river Laborec (Laborc) and the forests near Zalacska (today Zalužice, Slovakia). In the next year, Agnes donated these estates to their daughters and grandsons, establishing the Nagymihály lordship, an important fortune of the Kaplon clan. Peter had another daughter, Petronilla, who was the spouse of Philip, the ispán of Pilis County from 1251 to 1262. She compiled her last will and testament in 1258, in which she bequeathed the right of patronage over the Benedictine monastery of Kána to the sons of Jakó, Andrew (I) and Jakó (II). Due to these donations, both of them became prominent lords by the 1270s. Through Andrew, Jakó (I) was ancestor of the Nagymihályi kinship, for instance the Sztáray (Sztárai), Tibai, Ödönfi, Pongrácz, Ördög and Lucskai noble families.

== Sources ==
- Engel, Pál (1998). A nemesi társadalom a középkori Ung megyében [The Noble Society in Medieval Ung County] (in Hungarian). Társadalom- és művelődéstörténeti tanulmányok 25., MTA Történettudományi Intézete. ISBN 963-8312-59-9.
- Karácsonyi, János (1901). A magyar nemzetségek a XIV. század közepéig. II. kötet [The Hungarian genera until the middle of the 14th century, Vol. 2] (in Hungarian). Hungarian Academy of Sciences.
- Németh, Péter (2008). A középkori Szatmár megye települései a 15. század elejéig [Settlements of the medieval Szatmár County until the early 15th century] (in Hungarian). Jósa András Múzeum Kiadványai 60. ISBN 978-963-7220-63-0.
- Zsoldos, Attila (2011). Magyarország világi archontológiája, 1000–1301 [Secular Archontology of Hungary, 1000–1301] (in Hungarian). História, MTA Történettudományi Intézete. ISBN 978-963-9627-38-3.

Jakó I Genus Kaplon Born: ? Died: after 1263
Political offices
Preceded by Derek I Balassa	Ispán of Zólyom; 1243–1245	Succeeded by Mikó Balassa
Preceded by Derek II Balassa	Ispán of Zólyom; 1263	Succeeded by Michael Balassa
