= Krišovská Liesková =

Municipality of Slovakia

Krišovská Liesková Mokcsamogyorós
- Municipality
- Flag

- Location of Krišovská Liesková in the Košice Region Location of Krišovská Liesková in Slovakia
- Coordinates: 48.58°N 22.04°E
- Country: Slovakia
- Region: Košice Region
- District: Michalovce District
- First mentioned: 1321

Area
  - Total: 15.58 km^{2} (6.02 sq mi)
- Elevation: 102 m (335 ft)

Population (2025)
  - Total: 949
- Time zone: UTC+1 (CET)
  - Summer (DST): UTC+2 (CEST)
- Postal code: 790 1
- Area code: +421 56
- Vehicle registration plate (until 2022): MI
- Website: www.krisovskalieskova.sk

Krišovská Liesková (Slovak: [ˈkriʂɔwskaː ˈlɪeskɔʋaː]; Hungarian: Mokcsamogyorós) or Mokcsamogyorós is a village and municipality in Michalovce District in the Kosice Region of eastern Slovakia.

== History ==
In historical records the village was first mentioned in 1321. Before the establishment of independent Czechoslovakia in 1918, it was part of Ung County within the Kingdom of Hungary. Mokcsamogyorós was formed by the unification of the villages Mokcsakerész and Ungmogyorós.

== Geography ==
The municipality lies at an altitude of 102 metres (335 ft) and covers an area of 15.58 km^{2} (6.02 sq mi) (2025).

== Population ==
Population statistic (10 years)
Year	1995	2005	2015	2025
Count	819	878	934	949
Difference		+7.20%	+6.37%	+1.60%

Population statistic
Year	2024	2025
Count	942	949
Difference		+0.74%

It has a population of 949 people (31 December 2025).

=== Ethnicity ===
Census 2021 (1+ %)
Ethnicity	Number	Fraction
Hungarian	750	81.16%
Slovak	190	20.56%
Not found out	34	3.67%
Total	924	

In year 2021 was 924 people by ethnicity 750 as Hungarian, 190 as Slovak, 34 as Not found out, 7 as Romani, 4 as German, 2 as English, 1 as Ukrainian, 1 as Rusyn and 1 as Albanian.

Note on population: The difference values of population numbers in the table "Population statistic" and in the sections "Ethnicity" & "Religion" is caused by the use of various statistical methods.

=== Religion ===
Census 2021 (1+ %)
Religion	Number	Fraction
Calvinist Church	474	51.3%
Roman Catholic Church	221	23.92%
None	75	8.12%
Greek Catholic Church	74	8.01%
Not found out	41	4.44%
Evangelical Church	27	2.92%
Total	924	

In year 2021 was 924 people by religion 474 from Calvinist Church, 221 from Roman Catholic Church, 75 from None, 74 from Greek Catholic Church, 41 from Not found out, 27 from Evangelical Church, 4 from Jehovah's Witnesses, 2 from Eastern Orthodox Church, 2 from Islam, 1 from Old Catholic Church, 1 from Christian Congregations in Slovakia, 1 from United Methodist Church and 1 from Buddhism.
