= Blatné Revištia =

Village and municipality in Slovakia

Blatné Revištia Sárosrőcse
- Municipality
- Flag

- Location of Blatné Revištia in the Košice Region Location of Blatné Revištia in Slovakia
- Coordinates: 48.73°N 22.08°E
- Country: Slovakia
- Region: Košice Region
- District: Sobrance District
- First mentioned: 1244

Government
  - Mayor: Mária Húsková (STANK)

Area
  - Total: 5.15 km^{2} (1.99 sq mi)
- Elevation: 107 m (351 ft)

Population (2025)
  - Total: 224
- Time zone: UTC+1 (CET)
  - Summer (DST): UTC+2 (CEST)
- Postal code: 724 3
- Area code: +421 56
- Vehicle registration plate (until 2022): SO
- Website: blatnerevistia.sk

Blatné Revištia (Hungarian: Sárosrőcse, Rusyn: Блатны Ревіща) is a village and municipality in the Sobrance District in the Košice Region of east Slovakia.

== History ==
In historical records the village was first mentioned in 1244. Before the establishment of independent Czechoslovakia in 1918, Blatné Revištia was part of Ung County within the Kingdom of Hungary. From 1939 to 1944, it was part of the Slovak Republic. In the autumn of 1944, the Red Army entered Blatné Revištia and it was once again part of Czechoslovakia.

== Geography ==
The municipality lies at an altitude of 107 metres (351 ft) and covers an area of 5.15 km^{2} (1.99 sq mi) (2025).

== Population ==
Population statistic (10 years)
Year	1995	2005	2015	2025
Count	213	219	212	224
Difference		+2.81%	−3.19%	+5.66%

Population statistic
Year	2024	2025
Count	221	224
Difference		+1.35%

It has a population of 224 people (31 December 2025).

=== Ethnicity ===
Census 2021 (1+ %)
Ethnicity	Number	Fraction
Slovak	208	94.54%
Not found out	11	5%
Rusyn	3	1.36%
Total	220	

In year 2021 was 220 people by ethnicity 208 as Slovak, 11 as Not found out, 3 as Rusyn, 1 as Ukrainian and 1 as Moravian.

Note on population: The difference values of population numbers in the table "Population statistic" and in the sections "Ethnicity" & "Religion" is caused by the use of various statistical methods.

=== Religion ===
Census 2021 (1+ %)
Religion	Number	Fraction
Calvinist Church	77	35%
Roman Catholic Church	58	26.36%
Greek Catholic Church	46	20.91%
None	20	9.09%
Not found out	10	4.55%
Evangelical Church	7	3.18%
Total	220	

In year 2021 was 220 people by religion 77 from Calvinist Church, 58 from Roman Catholic Church, 46 from Greek Catholic Church, 20 from None, 10 from Not found out, 7 from Evangelical Church and 2 from Eastern Orthodox Church.

== Culture ==
The village has a public library.

== Genealogical resources ==
The records for genealogical research are available at the state archive "Statny Archiv in Presov, Slovakia"

- Greek Catholic church records (births/marriages/deaths): 1834–1895 (parish A)
- Reformated church records (births/marriages/deaths): 1797–1916 (parish B)

== See also ==
- List of municipalities and towns in Slovakia
