= Podhoroď =

Podhoroď Tibaváralja
- Municipality
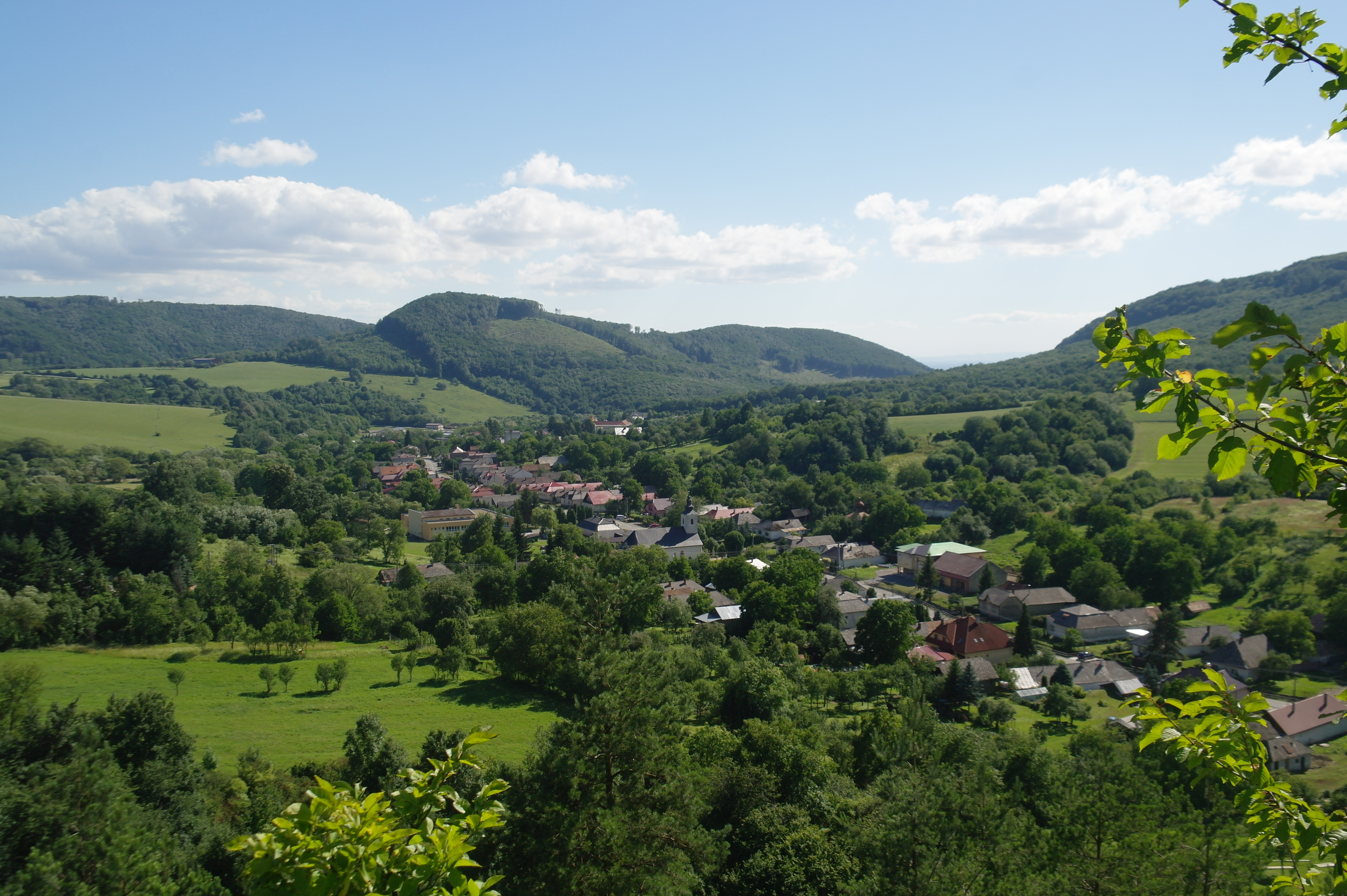

- Flag

- Location of Podhoroď in the Košice Region Location of Podhoroď in Slovakia
- Coordinates: 48.82°N 22.30°E
- Country: Slovakia
- Region: Košice Region
- District: Sobrance District
- First mentioned: 1406

Area
  - Total: 16.60 km^{2} (6.41 sq mi)
- Elevation: 345 m (1,132 ft)

Population (2025)
  - Total: 315
- Time zone: UTC+1 (CET)
  - Summer (DST): UTC+2 (CEST)
- Postal code: 726 4
- Area code: +421 56
- Vehicle registration plate (until 2022): SO
- Website: www.podhorod.sk

Podhoroď (Hungarian: Tibaváralja) is a village and municipality in the Sobrance District in the Košice Region of east Slovakia.

== History ==
In historical records the village was first mentioned in 1406.

== Geography ==
The municipality lies at an altitude of 345 metres (1,132 ft) and covers an area of 16.60 km^{2} (6.41 sq mi) (2025).

== Population ==
Population statistic (10 years)
Year	1995	2005	2015	2025
Count	438	395	362	315
Difference		−9.81%	−8.35%	−12.98%

Population statistic
Year	2024	2025
Count	320	315
Difference		−1.56%

It has a population of 315 people (31 December 2025).

=== Ethnicity ===
Census 2021 (1+ %)
Ethnicity	Number	Fraction
Slovak	290	86.05%
Rusyn	85	25.22%
Not found out	27	8.01%
Czech	9	2.67%
Total	337	

In year 2021 was 337 people by ethnicity 290 as Slovak, 85 as Rusyn, 27 as Not found out, 9 as Czech, 2 as Ukrainian, 2 as Romani, 2 as German, 2 as Hungarian and 1 as Other.

Note on population: The difference values of population numbers in the table "Population statistic" and in the sections "Ethnicity" & "Religion" is caused by the use of various statistical methods.

=== Religion ===
Census 2021 (1+ %)
Religion	Number	Fraction
Greek Catholic Church	146	43.32%
Eastern Orthodox Church	79	23.44%
None	44	13.06%
Not found out	26	7.72%
Roman Catholic Church	20	5.93%
Jehovah's Witnesses	16	4.75%
Other	4	1.19%
Total	337	

In year 2021 was 337 people by religion 146 from Greek Catholic Church, 79 from Eastern Orthodox Church, 44 from None, 26 from Not found out, 20 from Roman Catholic Church, 16 from Jehovah's Witnesses, 4 from Other, 1 from Calvinist Church and 1 from Evangelical Church.

== Facilities ==
The village has a public library, a gym and a football pitch, as well as a pharmacy and a doctor's surgery.

The village also has its own birth registry office.
