= Trnava pri Laborci =

Municipality of Slovakia

Trnava pri Laborci Tarna
- Municipality
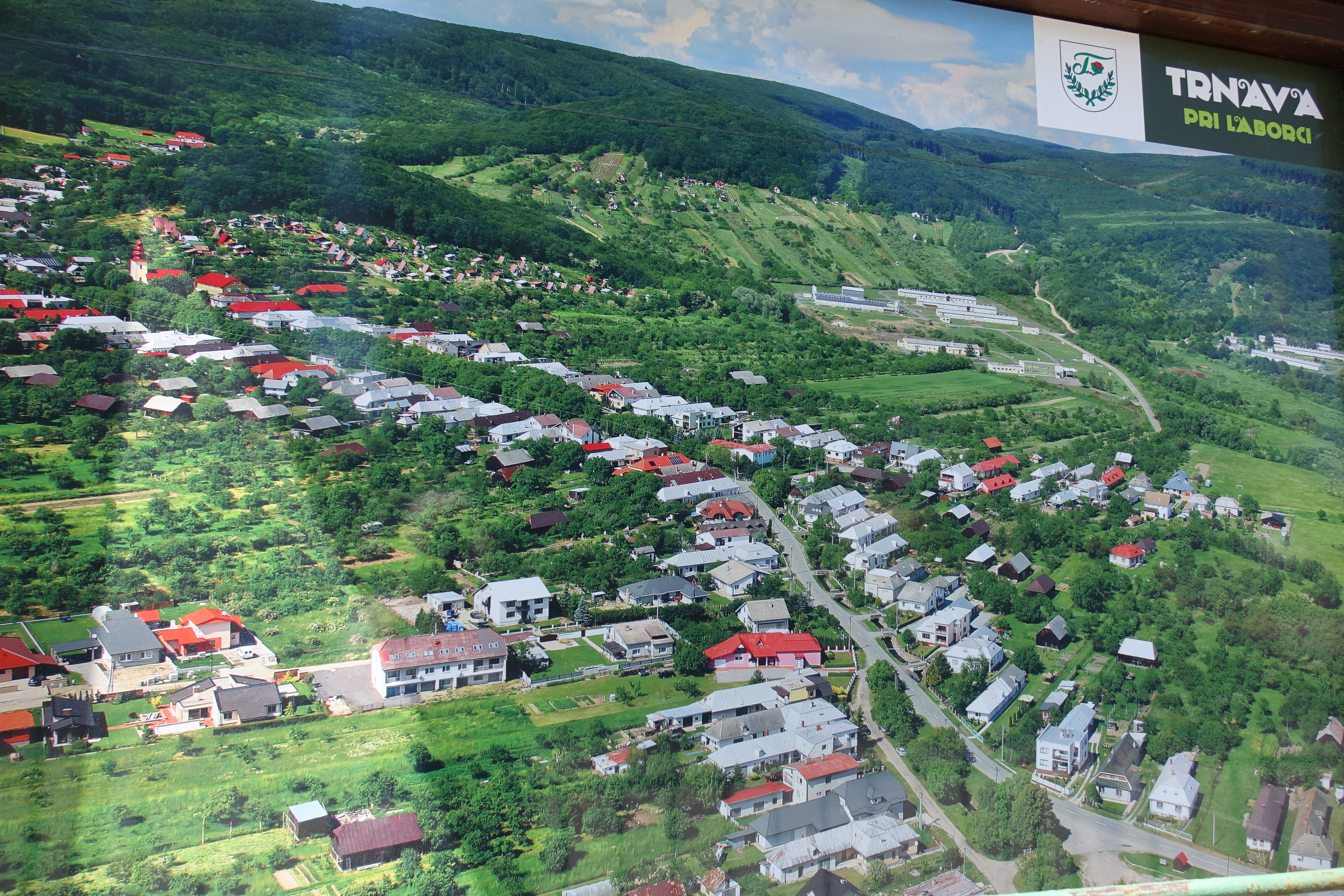

- Flag

- Location of Trnava pri Laborci in the Košice Region Location of Trnava pri Laborci in Slovakia
- Coordinates: 48.82°N 21.93°E
- Country: Slovakia
- Region: Košice Region
- District: Michalovce District
- First mentioned: 1249

Area
  - Total: 15.93 km^{2} (6.15 sq mi)
- Elevation: 163 m (535 ft)

Population (2025)
  - Total: 646
- Time zone: UTC+1 (CET)
  - Summer (DST): UTC+2 (CEST)
- Postal code: 723 1
- Area code: +421 56
- Vehicle registration plate (until 2022): MI
- Website: www.trnavaprilaborci.sk

Trnava pri Laborci (Slovak pronunciation: [ˈtr̩naʋa pri ˈlabɔrtsi]; Hungarian: Tarna) is a village and municipality in Michalovce District in the Kosice Region of eastern Slovakia.

== History ==
In historical records the village was first mentioned in 1249.

== Geography ==
The municipality lies at an altitude of 163 metres (535 ft) and covers an area of 15.93 km^{2} (6.15 sq mi) (2025).

== Population ==
Population statistic (10 years)
Year	1995	2005	2015	2025
Count	547	534	582	646
Difference		−2.37%	+8.98%	+10.99%

Population statistic
Year	2024	2025
Count	640	646
Difference		+0.93%

It has a population of 646 people (31 December 2025).

=== Ethnicity ===
Census 2021 (1+ %)
Ethnicity	Number	Fraction
Slovak	555	94.7%
Romani	28	4.77%
Not found out	21	3.58%
Czech	11	1.87%
Total	586	

In year 2021 was 586 people by ethnicity 555 as Slovak, 28 as Romani, 21 as Not found out, 11 as Czech, 4 as Ukrainian, 3 as Rusyn, 2 as Polish, 2 as German, 2 as Other and 2 as Greek.

Note on population: The difference values of population numbers in the table "Population statistic" and in the sections "Ethnicity" & "Religion" is caused by the use of various statistical methods.

=== Religion ===
Census 2021 (1+ %)
Religion	Number	Fraction
Greek Catholic Church	280	47.78%
Roman Catholic Church	181	30.89%
None	78	13.31%
Not found out	24	4.1%
Eastern Orthodox Church	11	1.88%
Calvinist Church	6	1.02%
Total	586	

In year 2021 was 586 people by religion 280 from Greek Catholic Church, 181 from Roman Catholic Church, 78 from None, 24 from Not found out, 11 from Eastern Orthodox Church, 6 from Calvinist Church, 2 from Other and not ascertained christian church, 1 from Other, 1 from Hinduism, 1 from Evangelical Church and 1 from Ad hoc movements.

== Transport ==
The village is accessible via regular bus lines.

The nearest railway station is 24 kilometres away at Michalovce.
