= Jus patronatus =

Concept in Catholic canon law

The right of patronage (in Latin jus patronatus or ius patronatus) in Catholic canon law is a set of rights and obligations of someone, known as the patron in connection with a gift of land (benefice). It is a grant made by the church out of gratitude towards a benefactor.

Its counterpart in English law and in the Church of England is called an advowson.

The right of patronage is designated in papal letters as "ius spirituali annexum" and is therefore subject to ecclesiastical legislation and jurisdiction as well as civil laws relating to the ownership of property.

== Background ==
In the Eastern Catholic Churches, the founder of a church was permitted to nominate an administrator for the temporal goods and indicate to the bishop a cleric suitable for appointment. In the Latin Church, the Synod of Orange in 441 granted a right of "presentation" to a bishop who had built a church in another diocese and the Synod of Toledo in 655 gave a layman this privilege for each church he built, but the founder had no proprietary rights.

In the countries occupied by the Germanic tribes, on the basis of the individual temple and church rights found in their national laws, the builder of a church, the feudal lord or the administrator possessed full right of disposal over the church founded or possessed by him, as his own church (ecclesia propria) and over the ecclesiastics appointed by him. However, the appointment and dismissal of ecclesiastics at least formally was made subject to the consent of the bishop. In the course of the Investiture Controversy, however, the private right over churches was abolished, although to the lord of the estate, as patron, was conceded the right of presenting a cleric to the bishop (ius praesentandi) on the occasion of a vacancy in the church. In England, unusually, this latter right was regulated by the Common Law, and referred to as advowson.

As Frangipane asserts in his thesis: "The giuspatronato, or jus patronato, or simply patronage, had its origins in the Church's gratitude toward its benefactors during the high Middle Ages. The main distinction of the later form of patronage, which serves to distinguish it from past expressions, is that of presentation as opposed to institution allowing multiple candidates to be nominated and considered for the office in question."

== Nature ==
A "personal" right of patronage (ius patronatus personale) is peculiar to a person as such, while a "real" right of patronage (reale) belongs to one in possession of something with which a patronage is connected (provided of course that he is qualified for the possession of the right of patronage). A "spiritual" patronage (ecclesiasticum; clericale) is one belonging to the incumbent of an ecclesiastical office, or established by the foundation of a church or a benefice out of ecclesiastical funds, or instituted by a layman and later presented to the Church. Thus the patronages in possession of secularized bishoprics, monasteries, and ecclesiastical foundations are regarded as spiritual. A lay patronage (laicale) is established when an ecclesiastical office is endowed by anyone out of private means. A patronage is mixed (mixtum) when held in common by the incumbent of an ecclesiastical office and a layman.

== Objects of patronage ==
Any church benefice, with the exception of the papacy, the cardinalate, the episcopate, and the prelatures of cathedral, collegiate and monastic churches, may be the object of the right of patronage. All persons and corporate bodies may be subject to the right of patronage. But persons, besides being capable of exercising the right, must be members of the Catholic Church. Thus non-Christians, Jews, heretics, schismatics and apostates are ineligible for any sort of patronage.

Nevertheless in Germany and Austria it has become customary as a result of the Peace of Westphalia (1648) for Protestants to possess the rights of patronage over Catholic, and Catholics over Protestant church offices. In modern concordats Rome has repeatedly granted the right of patronage to Protestant princes. Entirely ineligible for patronage are the excommunicati vitandi (the excommunicati tolerati are able at least to acquire it), and those who are infamous according to ecclesiastical or civil law. On the other hand, illegitimates, minors and women may acquire patronages.

== Gaining a right of patronage ==
A right of patronage is originally acquired by foundation, privilege or prescription:

- Under foundation (fundatio) in the broader sense is included the granting of the necessary means for the erection and maintenance of a benefice. Thus, granting that a church is necessary to a benefice, three things are requisite: the assignment of land, the erection of the church at one's private expense (aedificatio), and the granting of the means necessary for the support of the church and beneficiaries (dotatio). If the same person fulfills all three requirements, he becomes ipso jure patron, unless he waives his claim. Different persons performing these three acts become co-patrons. It is an accepted theory that one who is responsible for only one of the three acts mentioned, the other two conditions being fulfilled in any manner whatsoever, becomes a patron. It is possible to become a patron also through the reædiftatio ecclesiæ (rebuilding a church) and redotatio beneficii (reendowing the benefice).
- A second manner in which a patronage may be acquired is through papal privilege.
- A third is by prescription.

Derivatively, a patronage may be obtained through inheritance (in which case a patronage may easily become a co-patronage; by presentation), in which a lay patron must have the sanction of the bishop if he desires to transfer his right to another layman, but an ecclesiastic requires the permission of the pope to present it to a layman, or that of the bishop to give it to another ecclesiastic

An already existing right of patronage may be acquired by exchange, by purchase, or by prescription. In exchange or purchase of a real patronage the price of the object in question may not be raised in consideration of the patronage; the right of patronage being a ius spirituali annexum, such a thing would be simony.

A ruler of a country may acquire the right of patronage in any of the three ways mentioned but does not automatically have the right of patronage.

== Rights involved in patronage ==
The rights involved in patronage are: the right of presentation, honorary rights, utilitarian rights and the cura beneficii.

=== Right of presentation ===
The right of presentation (ius praesentandi) means that in case of a vacancy in the benefice, a patron may propose to the ecclesiastical superiors empowered with the right of collation, the name of a suitable person for that office. Co-patrons with the right of presentation may take turns, or each may present a name for himself, or it may be decided by vote. In the case of juridical persons the presentation may be made according to statute, or by turns, or by decision of the majority. The drawing of lots is excluded.

With regard to the one to be presented, in the case of a benefice involving the cure of souls, the ecclesiastical patron must choose from among the candidates for presentation the one he believes the most suitable, judging from the parish concursus. The lay patron has only to present the name of a candidate who is suitable in his opinion. In case this candidate has not passed the parish concursus, he must undergo an examination before the synodal examiners.

In the case of a mixed patronage, the rights of which are exercised in common by an ecclesiastical and a lay patron, the same rule holds as in the case of a lay patronage. Here it is the rule to deal with the mixed patronage, now as a spiritual and again as a lay patronage, according as it is most pleasing to the patrons. If the prerogatives of the mixed patronage are exercised in turn, however, it is considered as a spiritual or a lay patronage, as suits the nature of the case.

The patron cannot present his own name. Co-patrons may, however, present one of their own number. If through no fault of the patron, the name of an ineligible person is presented, he is granted a certain time of grace to make a new presentation. If, however, an ineligible person has been knowingly presented, the spiritual patron loses for the time being the right of presentation, but the lay patron, so long as the first interval allowed for presentation has not expired, may make an after-presentation. Thus the presentation of the spiritual patron is treated more after the manner of the episcopal collation. On that account the spiritual patron is not permitted an after-presentation or a variation in choice, which is permitted the lay patron, after which the bishop has the choice between the several names presented.

A presentation may be made by word of mouth or in writing. But under penalty of nullity all expressions are to be avoided which would imply a bestowal of the office. A simoniacal presentation would be invalid.

The time allowed for presentation is four months to a lay patron, and six to a spiritual patron; six months is stipulated for a mixed patronage when exercised in common, four or six months when turn is taken . The interval begins the moment announcement is made of the vacancy. For one who through no fault of his own has been hindered in making a presentation, the time does not expire at the end of the period mentioned. When his candidate has been unjustly rejected by the bishop, the patron may appeal, or make an after presentation.

=== Honorary rights ===
The honorary rights (iura honorifica) of the patron are: precedence in procession, a sitting in the church, prayers and intercessions, ecclesiastical mentions, burial in the church, ecclesiastical mourning, inscriptions, special incensing, the asperges (holy water), ashes, palms and the Pax.

=== Utilitarian rights ===
The utilitarian rights (iura utilia) of the patron consist essentially in that insofar as he is a descendant of the founder he is entitled to a maintenance allowance the superfluous funds of the church connected with the patronage if he has no other means to support himself. To draw any other material advantages from the church connected with the patronage, as so frequently happened in the Middle Ages, it is requisite for this condition to have been made at the time of foundation with the consent of the bishop, or that it be subsequently stipulated.

== Duties of patrons ==
The duty (iura onerosa) of the patron is, in the first place, the cura beneficii, the care to preserve unimpaired the status of the benefice and the conscientious discharge of the obligations connected therewith. He must not, however, interfere in the administration of the property of the benefice or the discharge of the spiritual duties on the part of the holder of the benefice. This cura beneficii entitles the patron to have a voice in all changes in the benefice and the property belonging to it. Again, on the patron is incumbent the defensio or the advocatia beneficii. In the present administration of justice however, this obligation has practically disappeared. Lastly, the patron has the subsidiary duty of building.

== End of a right of patronage ==
The right of patronage lapses at the suppression of the subject or object. If the church connected with the patronage is threatened with total ruin, or the endowment with a deficit, if those first bound to restore it are not at hand, the bishop is to exhort the patron to rebuild (reædificandum) or renew the endowment (ad redotandum). His refusal forfeits him the right of patronage, at least for himself personally. Furthermore, the right of patronage is lost upon express or tacit renunciation. And lastly, it lapses in cases of apostasy, heresy, schism, simoniacal alienation, usurpation of the ecclesiastical jurisdiction over the patronal church or appropriation of its goods and revenues, murder or mutilation of an ecclesiastic connected with the church.

In 1917 there was an effort to limit and decrease the number of patrons. In pursuit of this goal, Canon 1450 of the Canonical Codex Juris forbade the creation of any new privileges, while Canon 1451 recommends that the ordinaries encourage patrons to renounce the privilege in exchange for spiritual favor.

== See also ==
- Patronage in ancient Rome
