= Károlyi Palace =

Palaces owned by the Károlyi family

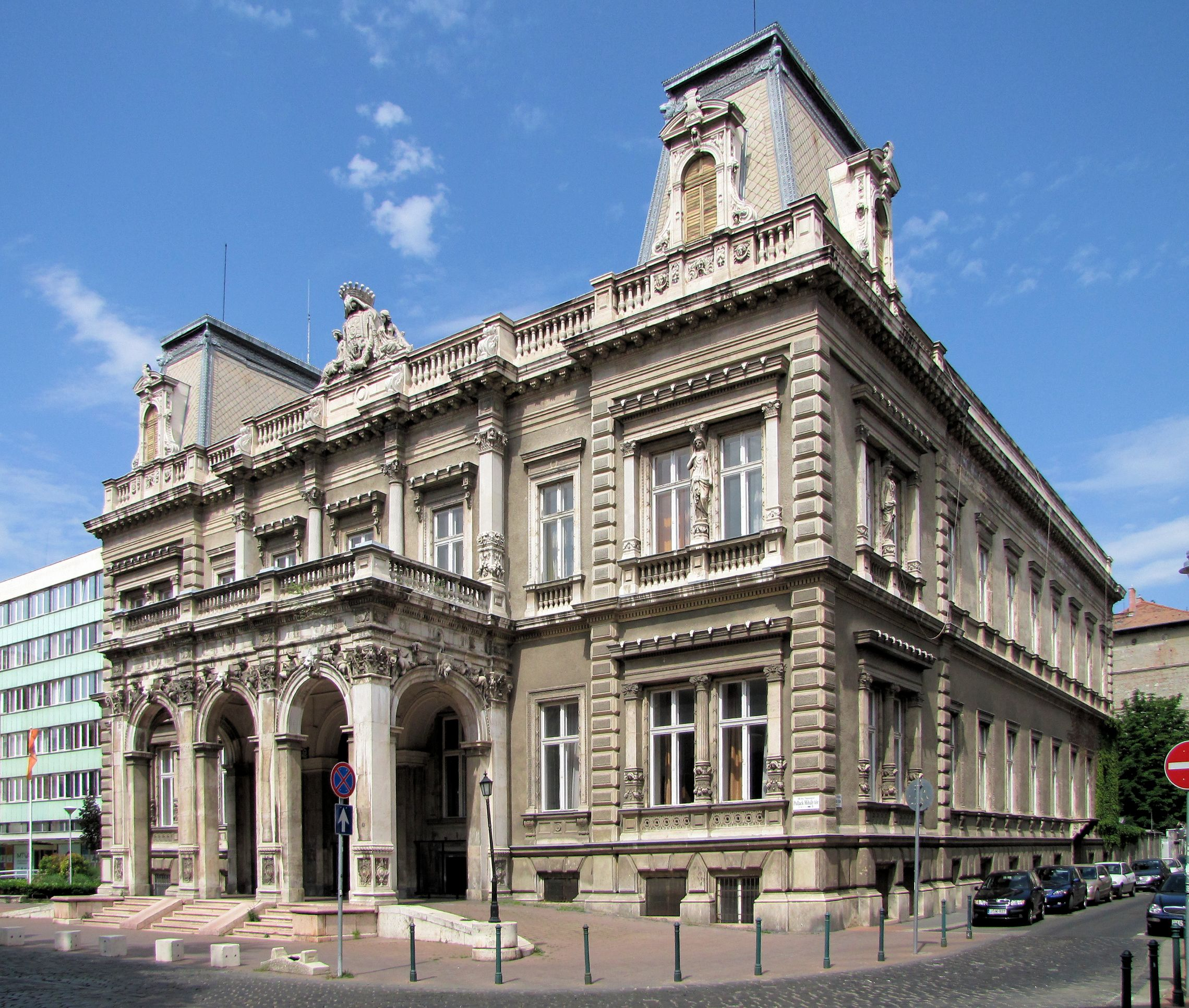
Károlyi Palace, Budapest (Pollack Mihály Square)

Károlyi Palace (Hungarian: Károlyi-palota) refers to a number of palaces in Hungary, particularly Budapest, which were owned by members of the Károlyi family.

== History ==
The Károlyi family is one of the ancient Hungarian noble families. Descendants of the Kaplon family (descendants of the Kaplon, second son of the chieftain Kond), which gained its estates during the conquest, including Kaplony (Romanian: Căpleni), where the family's ancient monastery stood, and the nearby Nagykároly (Romanian: Carei), from which the Károlyi family took its name.

== Palaces ==
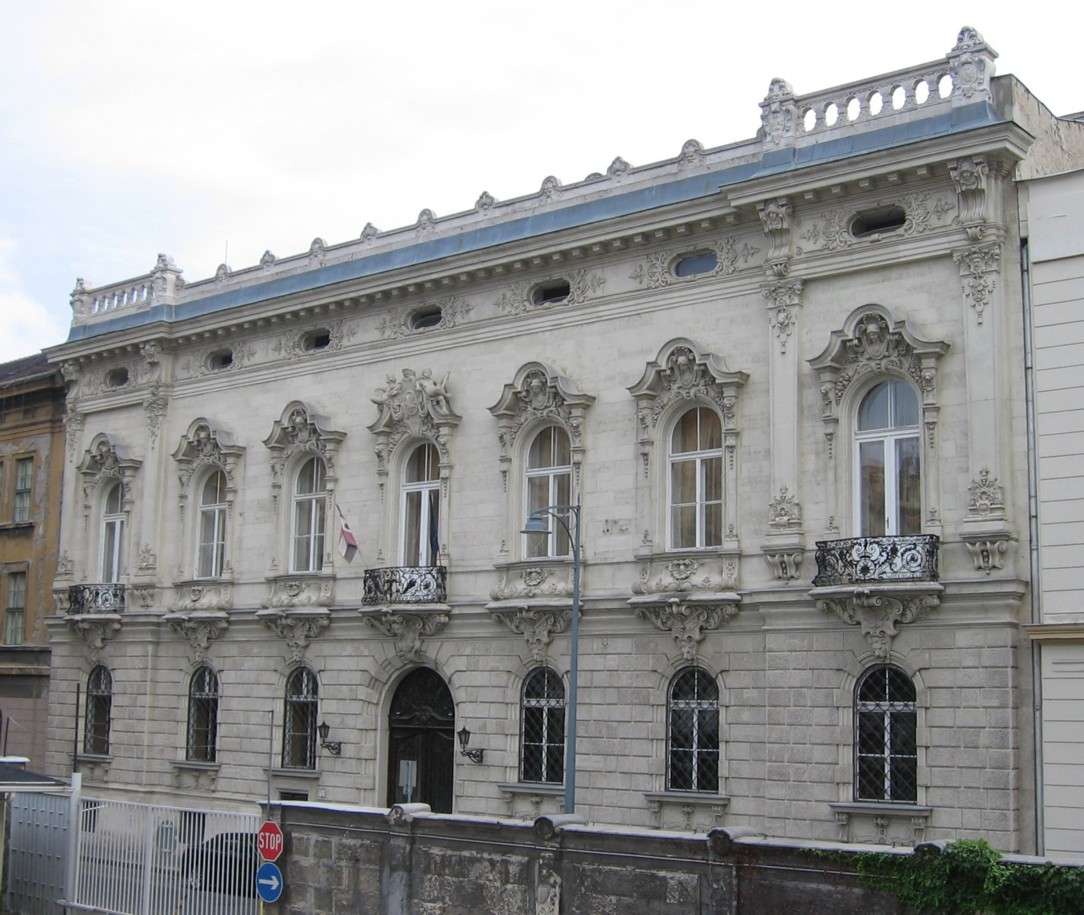
Károlyi Palace, Budapest (Reviczky Street)

=== Budapest, Hungary ===
- Károlyi Palace, Budapest (Pollack Mihály Square)
- Károlyi Palace, Budapest (Reviczky Street) (also known as the István Károlyi Palace or Károlyi-Csekonics Palace)
- Károlyi Palace, Budapest (Károlyi Street) (today houses the Petőfi Literary Museum)
- Károlyi Palace, Budapest (Szentkirályi Street) (today houses the Sinkovits Imre Institute for the Theatrical Arts and Antal Németh Institute of Drama Theory)

=== Vienna, Austria ===
- Palais Esterházy (Kärntner Straße) (formerly Károlyi Palace)

== See also ==
- Károlyi family
- Károlyi Castle
