= Emeric Nagymihályi =

Hungarian nobleman

Vice-ispán of Hont alongside Demetrius Kállai
- Reign: 1355
- Predecessor: Demetrius Kállai
- Successor: Anthony Kürti
- Died: after 1379
- Noble family: House of Nagymihályi
- Spouse: Catherine Butkai
- Issue: Petronilla
- Father: Andrew II Nagymihályi

Emeric Nagymihályi (Hungarian: Nagymihályi Imre; died after 1379) was a Hungarian nobleman in the 14th century, who served as vice-ispán of Hont County in 1355.

== Family ==
Emeric was born into the Nagymihályi family, which possessed landholdings in Northeastern Hungary, mostly Ung and Zemplén counties, and is considered the senior linage of the Nagymihály branch of the gens (clan) Kaplon. His father was Andrew (II), one of the sons of the influential lord Jakó Kaplon. Emeric had two brothers, Stephen (I) and Nicholas (I). Emeric married Catherine Butkai, a scion of the powerful gens (clan) Gutkeled.

== Life ==
Emeric is first mentioned by contemporary records in 1335, when took part in the process of division of the clan's estates along with several other family members in 1335. Two years later, in 1337, the Jakó's branch itself further divided its possessions within the family between the sons of Andrew (II) – i.e. Emeric, Stephen and Nicholas – and their cousins, the sons of Ladislaus (I). Thereafter, Emeric also possessed portions in the estates Nagymihály and Tiba (present-day Michalovce and Tibava in Slovakia, respectively). Louis I of Hungary confirmed the Nagymihályis' – including Emeric's – right of ownership over Nagymihály Castle (present-day ruins near Vinné) in 1345. By the year 1351, Emeric entered the service of Nicholas Zsámboki, who was Palatine of Hungary from 1342 to 1356. He acted as a juror in Zemplén County on behalf of his lord in that year. As a familiaris of the Zsámbokis, he is referred to as vice-ispán of Hont County in 1355, under Dominic Zsámboki, Nicholas' son. Emeric functioned as vice-ispán alongside Demetrius Kállai. He was replaced in 1358 at the latest, when Anthony Kürti is mentioned in this capacity. In the subsequent years, Emeric was involved in various lawsuits regarding the possessions of his family, against his neighbors and also other branches of the Nagymihályis.

Emeric murdered his wife Catherine Butkai, who was pregnant at the time, in 1376. Her mother, Anych, spouse of Nicholas Butkai, accused Emeric and his brother Stephen hiring their servant Anthony, son of Ladislaus to kill the woman, who was going to confession during the Holy Saturday fast, then her body was buried outside the cemetery and all her chattels were taken. In March 1376, Palatine Nicholas Garai ordered a criminal investigation by entrusting the monastery of Lelesz (today Leles, Slovakia) with this task. A month later, Emeric appeared before the investigate body and claimed that he murdered his wife alone, after allegedly she was caught in adultery by himself. In 1379, Emeric (and his brother Stephen) negotiated with his former mother-in-law Anych regarding the chattels (mostly cloathes) of the murdered wife, the trial was not yet concluded. King Louis I determined that if the jury cannot reach a decision, then Emeric and his brother must prove with an oath that Catherine was guilty of adultery. From a charter of King Sigismund from 1419, it can be concluded that Emeric was acquitted of the charge because he legally killed his wife due to the fact of adultery, thus the Butkais were unable to recover her wealth. Emeric died sometime after 1379. He had a daughter Petronilla, who was involved in a lawsuit against his relative Nicholas Lucskai in 1389.

== Sources ==
- Engel, Pál (1996). Magyarország világi archontológiája, 1301–1457, I. [Secular Archontology of Hungary, 1301–1457, Volume I] (in Hungarian). História, MTA Történettudományi Intézete. ISBN 963-8312-44-0.
- Nagy, Gyula, ed. (1887). A nagymihályi és sztárai gróf Sztáray család oklevéltára. Első kötet 1234–1396 [The Diploma Archive of the Count Sztáray de Nagymihály et Sztára Family. Volume One: 1234–1396] (in Hungarian). Count Antal Sztáray.
