= Stephen Nagymihályi =

Hungarian nobleman

Stephen (I) Nagymihályi

Vice-ispán of Szatmár
- Reign: 1367
- Predecessor: Leukus Panyolai
- Successor: Gregory Bethlen
- Died: after 1384
- Noble family: House of Nagymihályi
- Spouse: Helena Szeretvai
- Issue: Andrew V Ladislaus IV; Stephen II
- Father: Andrew II Nagymihályi

Stephen (I) Nagymihályi (Hungarian: Nagymihályi (I.) István; died after 1384) was a Hungarian nobleman in the 14th century, who served as vice-ispán of Szatmár County in 1367.

== Family ==
Stephen (I) was born into the Nagymihályi family, which possessed landholdings in Northeastern Hungary, mostly Ung and Zemplén counties, and is considered the senior lineage of the Nagymihály branch of the gens (clan) Kaplon. His father was Andrew (II), one of the sons of the influential lord Jakó Kaplon. Stephen had two brothers, Emeric and Nicholas (I). Stephen married Helena Szeretvai. She was a daughter of Ramocsa, the progenitor of the Ramocsa de Szeretva family. Helena was mentioned as Stephen's widow in 1398.

== Life ==
Stephen is first mentioned by contemporary records in 1335, when took part in the process of division of the clan's estates along with several other family members in 1335. Two years later, in 1337, the Jakó's branch itself further divided its possessions within the family between the sons of Andrew (II) – i.e. Emeric, Stephen and Nicholas – and their cousins, the sons of Ladislaus (I). Thereafter, Stephen also possessed portions in the estates Nagymihály and Tiba (present-day Michalovce and Tibava in Slovakia, respectively). In the subsequent years, Stephen, alongside his brothers, was involved in various lawsuits regarding the possessions of his family, against his neighbors and also other branches of the Nagymihályis.

Stephen entered the service of Palatine Nicholas Zsámboki by the year 1351. Sometime after, he became a familiaris of Simon Meggyesi. In this capacity, he served as castellan of Izdenc Castle in Križevci County (today ruins near Veliki Zdenci, Croatia) in 1357. Under Meggyesi, Stephen was styled as vice-ispán of Varaždin County in 1360. When Meggyesi was appointed ispán of Szatmár County in 1367, Stephen followed his lord becoming his deputy. It is possible he functioned as vice-ispán until 1369.

In 1376, Catherine Butkai, Emeric's wife and Stephen's sister-in-law was murdered. Her mother accused Emeric and Stephen hiring a servant to kill the woman, then her body was buried outside the cemetery and all her chattels were taken. In March 1376, Palatine Nicholas Garai ordered a criminal investigation by entrusting the monastery of Lelesz (today Leles, Slovakia) with this task. A month later, Emeric appeared before the investigate body and claimed that he murdered his wife alone, after allegedly she was caught in adultery by himself. In 1379, Emeric (and his brother Stephen) negotiated with the mother of Catherine regarding the chattels (mostly cloathes) of the murdered wife, the trial was not yet concluded. King Louis I of Hungary determined that if the jury cannot reach a decision, then Emeric and his brother must prove with an oath that Catherine was guilty of adultery. From a charter of King Sigismund from 1419, it can be concluded that Emeric was acquitted of the charge because he legally killed his wife due to the fact of adultery, thus the Butkais were unable to recover her wealth.

Louis I confirmed Stephen's right to possess Tiba in full nobility (i.e. without any tax burden) in 1377, together with other members of his kinship. The charter refers to him as a magister. Stephen died sometime after 1384. His marriage produced three children: Andrew (V), Ladislaus (IV) and Stephen (II). The last living branch of the Nagymihályi family, which became extinct in 1449, descended from Ladislaus (IV). Stephen's namesake son, Stephen (II) was killed in the Battle of Nicopolis in 1396, together with distant relative John Tibai.

== Sources ==
- Engel, Pál (1996). Magyarország világi archontológiája, 1301–1457, I. [Secular Archontology of Hungary, 1301–1457, Volume I] (in Hungarian). História, MTA Történettudományi Intézete. ISBN 963-8312-44-0.
- Nagy, Gyula, ed. (1887). A nagymihályi és sztárai gróf Sztáray család oklevéltára. Első kötet 1234–1396 [The Diploma Archive of the Count Sztáray de Nagymihály et Sztára Family. Volume One: 1234–1396] (in Hungarian). Count Antal Sztáray.
