= Kaplon (chieftain) =

Kaplon (or Cupan) was a Hungarian tribal chieftain, the second son of Kond, who was one of the seven chieftains of the Magyars according to Anonymus, author of the Gesta Hungarorum. It is possible that Kurszán, who was killed in 904, was his elder brother.

After the Hungarian conquest of the Carpathian Basin (895 or 896–c. 907), the brothers Kücsid and Kaplon settled in the Nyírség, northeastern part of the Great Hungarian Plain and founded a monastery in Kaplony (today: Căpleni, Romania), near the Ecsed Marsh. Chieftain Kaplon was the ancestor of the gens (or clan) Kaplon. The Károlyi (which still exists), Bagossy, Csomaközy, Vadai and Vetési families were also originate from that genus.

== Sources ==
- János Karácsonyi: A magyar nemzetségek a XIV. század közepéig. Budapest: Magyar Tudományos Akadémia. 1900–1901.
- Gyula Kristó (editor): Korai Magyar Történeti Lexikon - 9–14. század (Encyclopedia of the Early Hungarian History - 9-14th centuries); Akadémiai Kiadó, 1994, Budapest; ISBN 963-05-6722-9.
