= Viniansky Castle =

Historic site in Slovakia

Coordinates: 48°49′N 21°57′E

- Viniansky Hrad
- Vinné, Michalovce District, Slovakia
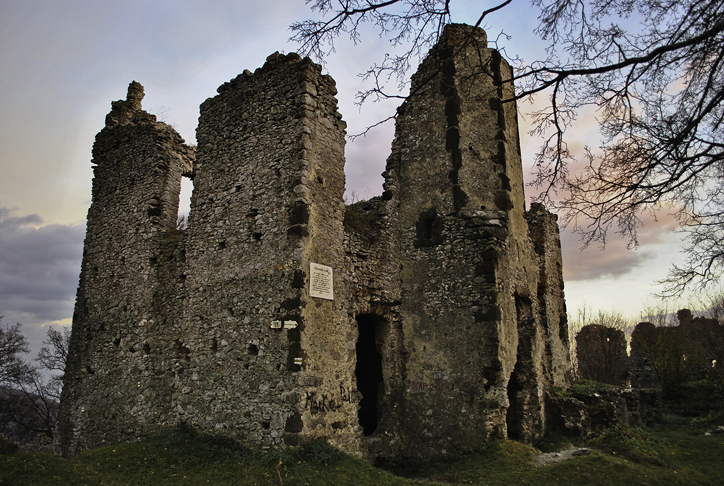

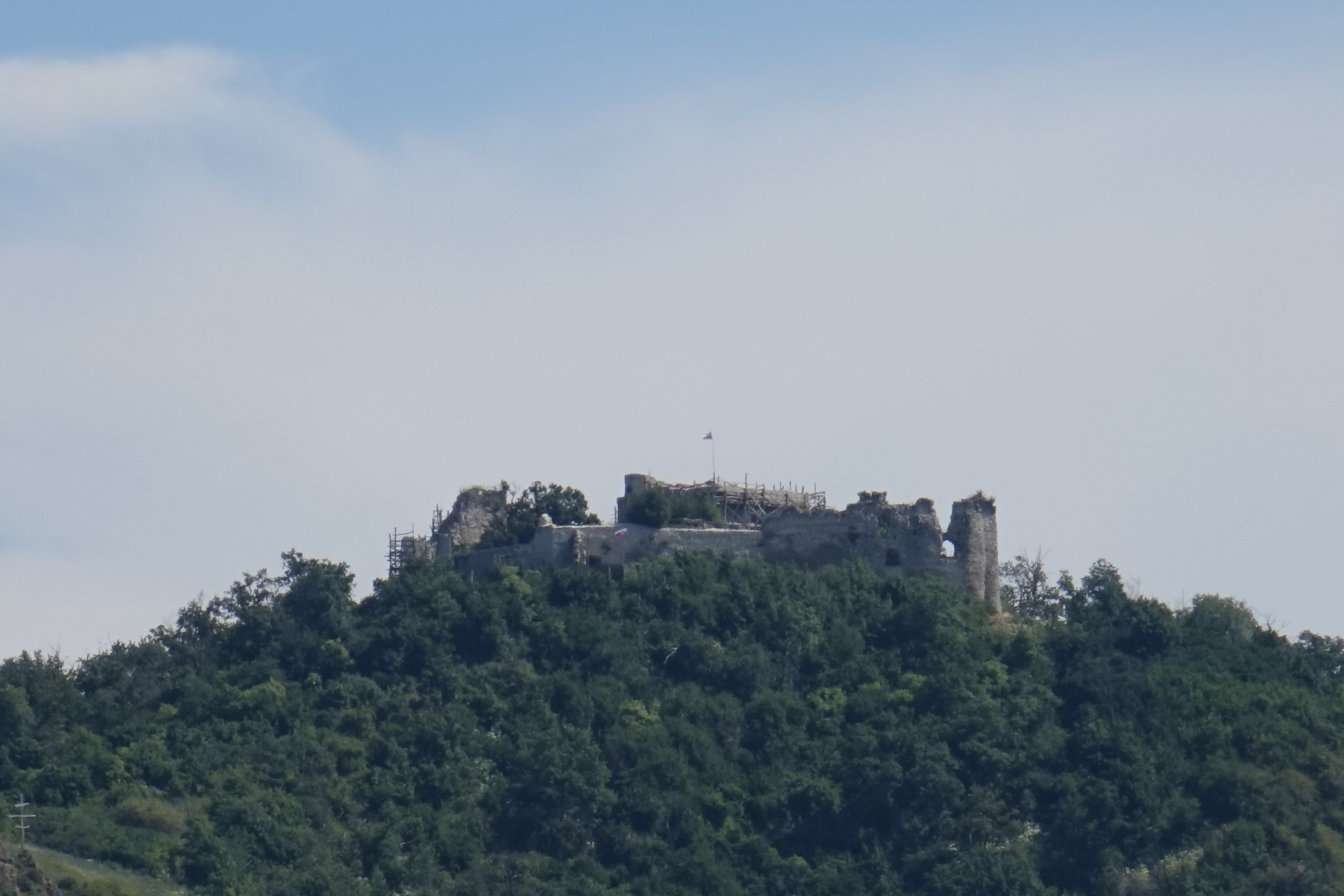
- Viniansky Castle from afar

Site information
- Type: Castle
- Controlled by: Cultural Heritage Monuments of Slovakia
- Open to the public: yes
- Condition: In ruins

Viniansky Castle (Slovak:Viniansky Hrad) are the ruins of a Gothic castle on the mostly andesite hill on the south-west part of the Vihorlat Hills above the village of Vinné, in the Michalovce District of Slovakia.

Currently, the castle has been under reconstruction since 2011, which is being carried out by the Zemplínsko-Užská hradná cesta civic association.

== History ==
The castle was constructed prior to 1312.

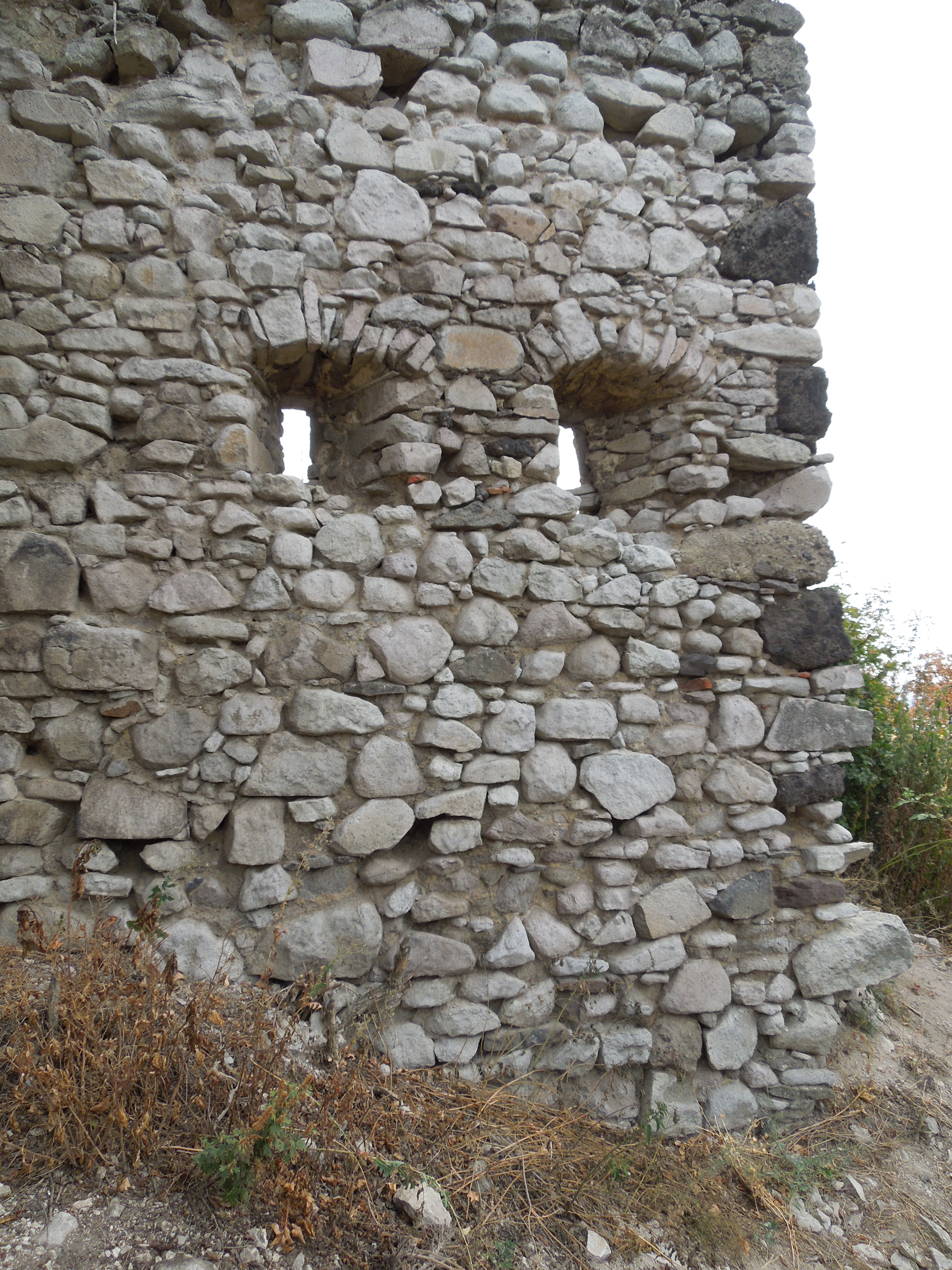
One of a few fully preserved walls of the ruins.

== Findings from the castle ==
During the reconstruction of the castle in 2018, there was a discovery of almost two thousand copper coins in a clay jug, dating from 1858 to 1860, along with brightly colored Renaissance tiles, various decorative parts of the facade, metal keys, arrowheads and remains of ceramics.
