= Kaplon (genus) =

Genus (gens) Kaplon
- Country: Principality of Hungary; Kingdom of Hungary
- Founded: c. 895
- Founder: Kaplon (Cupan)
- Dissolution: 14th century
- Cadet branches: a, Károly branch: House of Bagossy; House of Csomaközy; House of Károlyi; House of Vadai; House of Vetési; b, Lele branch: House of Kaplyan; c, Nagymihály branch: House of Nagymihályi; House of Ödönfi; House of Bánfi; House of Tibai; House of Lucskai; House of Sztáray; House of Pongrácz; d, Imreg branch: House of Cékei; House of Imregi; e, Sályi branch f, Papos branch: House of Tákosi; House of Barlabássy; g, Vitka branch: House of Vitkai; h, Terebes branch

Kaplon, also Kaplony or Kaplyon (Caplon, Coplyon, Caplan, Coplyan, Kaplyn, Koplon, Koplen, Kopplyan), was the name of a gens (Latin for "clan"; nemzetség in Hungarian) in the Kingdom of Hungary. The founder and ancestor of the genus was Kaplon (or Cupan), the second son of Kond, who was one of the seven chieftains of the Magyars according to Anonymus, author of the Gesta Hungarorum. The clan's original tribal area was the Nyírség, northeastern part of the Great Hungarian Plain.

The distinguished and influential Károlyi family originates from the Genus Kaplon. Among others, the Sztáray, Barlabássy, Bagossy, Csomaközy, Vadai and Vetési families were also from that clan and had spread northward, eastward and southward.

== Origin ==
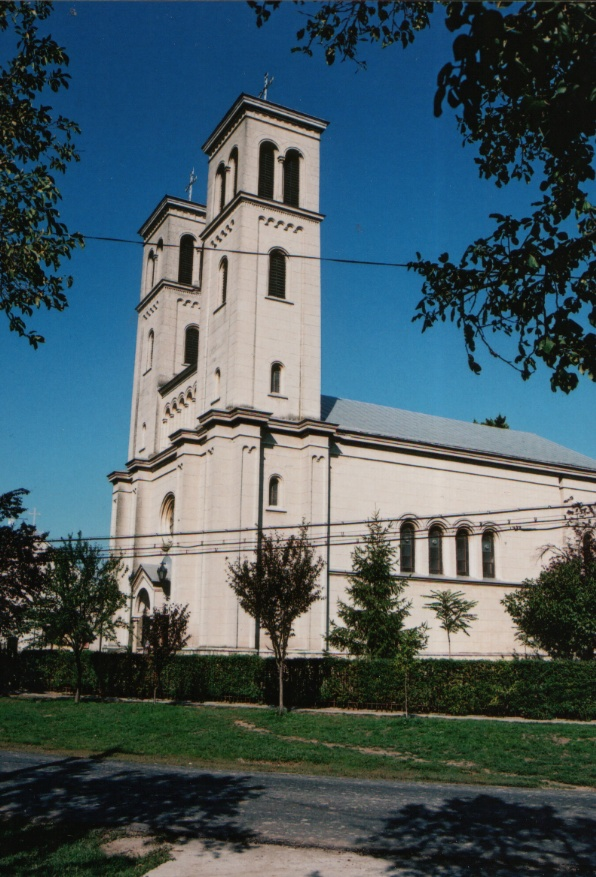
The Neo-Romanesque church of Căpleni (today in Romania), built by Miklós Ybl based on ruins of the original structure

According to the tradition, the Kaplon genus was one of the ancient Hungarian kindreds, which arrived to the Carpathian Basin during the Hungarian conquest in the late 9th century. The 13th-century chronicler Simon of Kéza in his work Gesta Hunnorum et Hungarorum says that one of the chieftains of the conquest was Kond (or Künd), who settled in the Nyírség region. His sons were named Küsid and Kaplon (Cupian, or Kaplony). Based on the Gesta Hungarorum, several historians identified Küsid with Kurszán (or Kusal) initially, but later doubts arose about this. The Kaplon kindred considered Kaplon, the younger son as their progenitor. His name probably comes from Turkic "kaplan", meaning "tiger". Sometime after the Christianization of Hungary (11th century), most plausibly in the mid-12th century, the kindred erected their Benedictine clan monastery dedicated to St. Martin of Tours at their namesake centre Kaplony in Szatmár County (present-day Căpleni, Romania). The monastery itself is first mentioned by contemporary records only in 1267. Based on a now lost charter from 1195, Sándor Károlyi put the date of the foundation to the year 1080. The kindred spread in the area between the rivers Szamos (Someș) and Kraszna (Crasna).

Historian Péter Németh considered the person of Kaplon as a fabrication by 13th-century chroniclers, since several scholars – e.g. János Karácsonyi, Bálint Hóman, Gyula Kristó – considered that Szatmár County was established after the death of Stephen I. Németh argued that the Hungarians initially conquered the region from east until the left bank of river Szamos. It is possible that ancestors of the Kaplon kindred took part in this process, but not only them exclusively. Péter Németh emphasized the uncertainty that the Kaplons was really the original and ancient occupying kindred at the time of the Hungarian conquest over the region. According to the contemporary records, he argued, the Kaplon clan acquired the surrounding lands over their ancient estate Kaplony only in the second half of the 13th century, for instance, Vetés (Vetiș), Károly (Carei) and Bagos (Boghiș), the namesakes of noble families breaking out of the genus. By the end of the 12th century, the Kaplons possessed overwhelming portions in the Avas forest (today Oaș Mountains). Németh argued the Kaplons arrived to the region at the turn of the 11th and 12th centuries, when the castle district of Szatmár was established.

Former historiography assumed a Transdanubian branch of the kindred, involving Zlaudus, the Bishop of Veszprém as the most illustrious member of it. In fact, however, that kinship belonged to the gens (clan) Ják.

== Branches ==
=== Károly branch ===
Joshua, the first known member of the branch lived sometime between 1150 and 1180. His name is mentioned by the Regestrum Varadinense. Accordingly, he possessed a portion in Vada, northwest of Károly (present-day a borough of the town). His son was Andrew (I), who died before 1219. His widow and his sons – Simon (I) and Michael – were involved in a lawsuit against castle folks of Szatmár, who claimed that the late Andrew unlawfully seized portions of lands in Vada from them. Simon (I) was still alive in 1264, when acquired an unidentified estate in Szatmár County, once belonged to the Kaplon clan. He had three sons: Peter (I), Endes and Andrew (II). Peter was progenitor of the Bagosi, Vetési and Csomaközi noble families through his descendants, while the short-lived Vadai family (became extinct before 1396) originated from Endes. The third brother, Andrew (II) was the ancestor of the illustrious Károlyi family (and its cadet branch, the Lancz de Károly family). One of his sons Simon I Károlyi used this surname first, but soon he was followed by his brothers – Nicholas, Michael and Merhard – in this method.

Peter (I) paid a blood price of 25 marks for accidentally killing a nobleman in 1277. Peter and Endes bought a portion in Vada from the clan's Lele branch in 1288. They also bought portions in Csomaköz (today Ciumești, Romania), Ömböly and Rezetelek located near their estate Bere (today Berea, part of Ciumești) in 1298. The three brothers – Peter (I), Endes and Andrew (II) – and their cousin Mike (son of Michael) reserved their right for a portion in Bere, which came into the possession of another family, in 1291. There were conflicts in the possession rights over Csomaköz between the sons of Peter (I) – John (I), Peter (II) "Zonga", Philip, Martin, Simon (II) – and Endes – George "the Black" and Deun (or Dévény) – in the early 14th century. Their agreement in 1306 did not bring lasting reconciliation. A duel almost ensued between George "the Black" (the first Vadai) and Peter (II) "Zonga" (the first Vetési) in 1319. Andrew (II) and his aforementioned nephews inherited the estates – portions in Kolcs (Culciu) and Vetés – of Andrew (III), son of Mike, who died without male descendants before 1312. They were obliged to pay dower to Andrew's mother and widow. The payment took a long time, thus Andrew's widow left Kolcs only in 1322. However, they were unable to receive Olcsva, because the local (in nearby Szamosszeg) official of the rebellious Beke Borsa refused to hand over it. After the fall of the Borsas' rebellion, Andrew (II) and his nephews were granted the estate.

Meanwhile the relationship remained tense between the family members regarding Csomaköz. Andrew (II) sued his nephew Peter (II), who was sentenced to death, in 1320, but the sentence was not carried out. He again launched a lawsuit against the sons of the late Peter (I) together with his sons Simon and Michael (the first Károlyis) and George Vadai in 1322. The family members entered into an agreement of land division in 1325. Andrew (II) and his four sons were granted Olcsva (thus the first Károlyis was also referred to as Olcsvais in early times) with the surrounding land Mikecsalános. The sons and grandsons of Peter (I) received half of Vetés, portions in Kolcs and Pete (Petea), while the Vadais (the sons of Endes) acquired the other half part of the same villages. Peter's five sons further divided their inherited possessions among themselves in 1325 and 1341, which led to the formation of the various aforementioned noble families named after their centre settlements.

Family tree

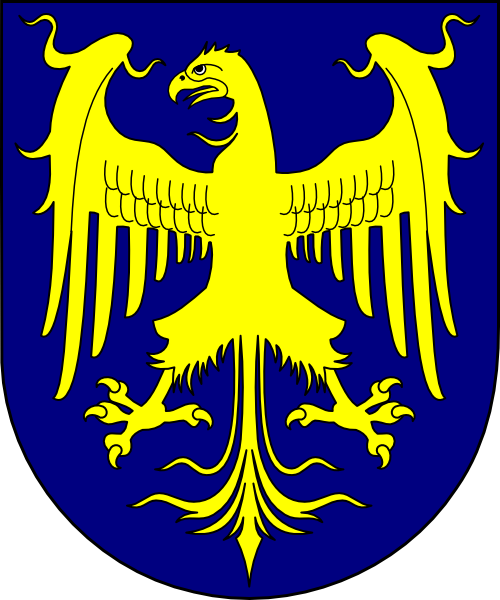
Coat of arms of Albert Vetési, Bishop of Veszprém

- Joshua
  - Andrew I (d. before 1219) ∞ unidentified (fl. 1219)
    - Simon I ("Devil"; fl. 1219–1264)
      - Peter I (fl. 1277–1298) ∞ Anne Turul
        - John I (fl. 1306)
          - Simon III ("Great"; fl. 1325–1357)
            - Bagosi (Bagossy) family
          - John II ("Waisted"; fl. 1325–1342)
        - Peter II ("Zonga"; fl. 1306–1342)
          - Vetési family
        - Philip (fl. 1306)
        - Martin (fl. 1306–1355) ∞ Anne Vásári
          - Csomaközi family
        - Simon II (fl. 1306)
      - Endes (fl. 1288–1298)
        - Vadai family
      - Andrew II ("Devil"; fl. 1291–1325)
        - Károlyi family
    - Michael (fl. 1219)
      - Mike (fl. 1291) ∞ unidentified (fl. 1312)
        - Andrew III (d. before 1312) ∞ unidentified (fl. 1312–1322)

=== Lele branch ===
This minor branch centered around Lele in the northernmost part of Szilágy County (present-day Lelei, part of commune Hodod in Romania). It is plausible it was strongly related to the Károly branch, who wanted to enforce their right of pre-emption in any case in the case of a contract concerning the Lele estates. Elijah (himself a son of George) and his son Peter sold their portion in Vada in 1288. The other son John also sold his portion in Bere in 1291. Together with his son Thomas, John sold significant portions in Lele to Martin Mátéházi, the castellan of Déva in 1337, who already sized another portions in 1334. The Károly branch protested against these sales in 1334 and 1345 too. The Kaplyan (or Kaplyon) de Lele noble family descended from Benedict.

Family tree

- George
  - Elijah (fl. 1288)
    - Peter (fl. 1288)
    - John (fl. 1291–1337)
      - Thomas (fl. 1337)
        - Benedict ("Kaplyan"; fl. 1388–1416)
          - Kaplyan de Lele family

=== Nagymihály branch ===
The first known member of this branch was Jakó (I), who was plausibly ispán of Zólyom County from 1243 to 1245, and in 1263. He married Catherine, a great-granddaughter of Apa, who was a ban of Slavonia in the mid-12th century. Through this marriage, Jakó's branch acquired several landholdings in Ung and Zemplén counties, since Peter, Catherine's father had no male descendants. In 1244, Peter bequeathed his estate Reviscse (present-day Blatné Revištia, Slovakia) to Jakó's wife. In 1248, Peter handed over the dower to his wife Agnes, which contained the estates Mihály and Tapolya (present-day Michalovce, Slovakia) with their accessories along the river Laborec (Laborc) and the forests near Zalacska (today Zalužice, Slovakia). In the next year, Agnes donated these estates to their daughters and grandsons, establishing the Nagymihály lordship, an important fortune of the Kaplon clan. Peter and Agnes donated another villages – Vinna (Vinné), Zalacska and Tarna (Trnava pri Laborci) – surrounding the aforementioned estates to their daughters still in that year. Béla IV confirmed the donations. Peter's another daughter, Petronilla compiled her last will and testament in 1258, in which she bequeathed the right of patronage over the Benedictine monastery of Kána to the sons of Jakó, Andrew (I) and Jakó (II). Due to these donations, both of them became prominent lords by the 1270s, Jakó (II) even served as Master of the cupbearers from 1279 to 1280.

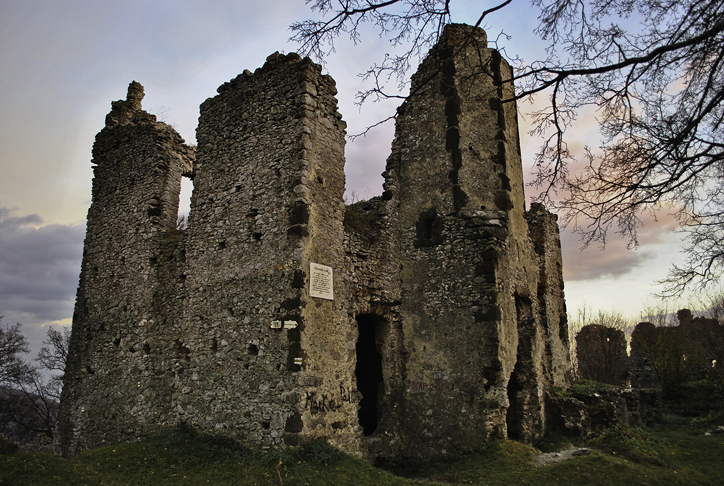
Vinné (Nagymihály) Castle, built by Jakó and Andrew Kaplon in the last decades of the 13th century

Andrew (I) and Jakó (II) functioned as ispán of Ung and Zemplén counties in 1273, respectively. In that year, the brothers were granted the estates Sztára (today Staré) and Perecse (today a borough of Michalovce, Slovakia) in Ung County for their loyalty by Ladislaus IV. Jakó and Andrew began to establish Nagymihály lordship, an important centre of their estates, which laid in the borderland of Zemplén and Ung counties in the area between the rivers Laborec (Laborc) and Szeretva (or Cserna). Sometime in the last third of the 13th century, they built the castle of Nagymihály, a fortified stronghold in the region (present-day ruins, belongs to Vinné). It is possible that they also erected the nearby Barkó Castle (today ruins above Brekov, Slovakia) in the same period. In 1279, Ladislaus IV donated them the fort of Jeszenő (today Jasenov, Slovakia) with the surrounding forest as a "lost heritage". The Kaplons' centre, Nagymihály was granted right to hold fair. They swore loyalty to the new monarch Andrew III in 1290. They bought the land Tiba (today Tibava, Slovakia) in Ung County. The brothers erected a small castle there ("Tibavára", today ruins near Podhoroď, Slovakia) around 1300.

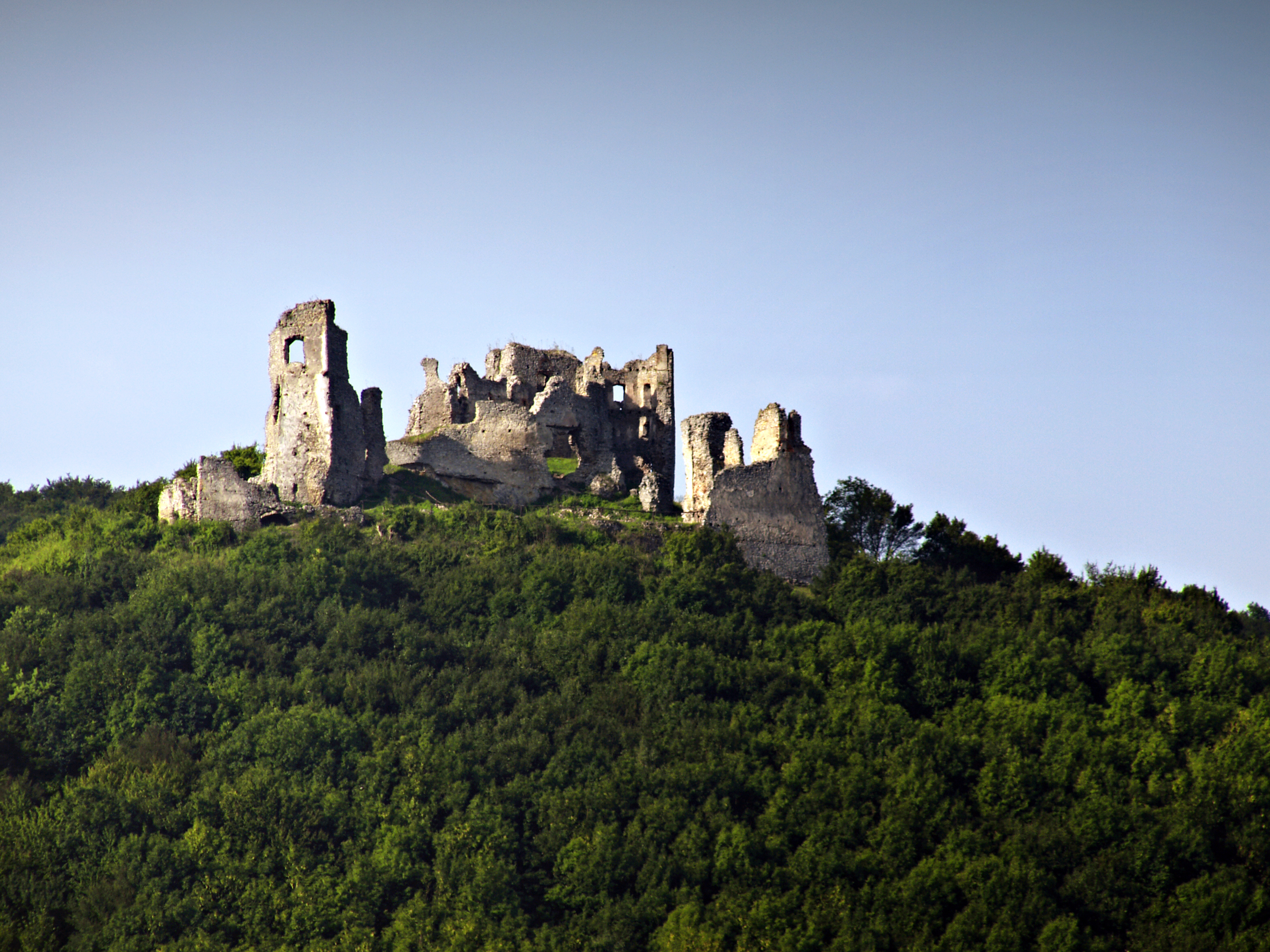
Brekov (Barkó) Castle, built by the Kaplon brothers in the late 13th century

Following the extinction of the Árpád dynasty and the era of Interregnum (1301–1310), Amadeus Aba, as a powerful oligarch, ruled de facto independently the north-eastern region of the Kingdom of Hungary, including Ung County. However, the Kaplons and their province, the Nagymihály lordship were able to maintain their independence. During the Abas' rebellion against Charles I, their troops commanded by Dominic Csicseri pillaged and occupied the castle of Tiba from the Kaplons. Following his victory, the monarch returned the demolished fort to the kinship. The lordship was one of the most important strongholds in Northeastern Hungary in the early 14th century. Excluding the Drugeths, only the Nagymihályis possessed a castle in Ung County, while they were also considered influential landowners in Zemplén County too. By the end of the 14th century, the Nagymihály lordship spread over a total of 650 km2 in the two counties, containing a market town (Nagymihály itself), 43 (later 56) villages and ca. 930 servant families. In the northeastern region, only the magnate families of Drugeths, Cudars, Bebeks and Perényis possessed more extensive territories.

However, the branch proved to be quite numerous in the 14th century, which led to the fragmentation of the unified Nagymihály property: Andrew (I) and Jakó (II) had altogether five sons, ten grandsons and fourteen great-grandsons who also begot offspring. Jakó's sub-branch became extinct in 1449. During that time, Andrew's sub-branch had altogether 27 male members. Various noble families descended from the latter (see family tree). Under such circumstances, various land division contracts occurred in the 14–15th centuries. As a result of the first divisions (1335–1337), seven separate lordships were formed by 1350, which became the basis of the emerging noble families (Tibai, Ördög, Lucskai, Ödönfi, Bánfi, Pongrácz and Jakó's Nagymihályi kinship). Among these families, only the Tibai family retained its importance at the county level due to their loyal services.

The Nagymihályis (Jakó's descendants) became more wealthy than the other families, because only two of Jakó's sons – Andrew (II) and Ladislaus (I) – had known offspring. Already them began to use the Nagymihályi surname by the mid-14th century, after their permanent residence. The Nagymihályis possessed significant portions throughout in Ung County, for instance, in Szobránc (Sobrance), Jeszenő, Alsóribnice (Nižná Rybnica), Felsőreviscse (Veľké Revištia), Felsőtiba and Baskóc (Baškovce). Ladislaus' branch died out in 1421, thus Andrew's branch inherited their all property, thus, half of the former Nagymihály lordship once again rested in one hand. The last member of the Nagymihályis was Ladislaus (V), a prominent local partisan of John Hunyadi's league. He died in 1449.

Some members of the Nagymihályi family entered court service. John (III) was referred to as courtly knight in 1351, when took part in the Louis I of Hungary's crusade against the Lithuanians in that year. For his participation and loyalty, Tiba (Szobránc) received the right to hold weekly and national fairs. He died sometime before 1356. His young daughter Euphrosyne was granted her daughters' quarter in the form of an estate, by the grace of the monarch. John's half-brother James (II) functioned as castellan of Borostyánkő (today Bernstein im Burgenland, Austria) in 1385. His son, John (IV) was a member of the group of so-called "royal youth" in 1398. Sigismund confirmed Tiba's right to hold a fair upon his request. He was among the lords, who sealed the Treaty of Lubowla in 1412. He acted as a juror of a national judicial court in 1415. Another family member, John (V) was also a member of the "royal youth" in 1412.

The most prominent member of the family was Albert, who originated from the branch of Jakó (IV). Despite being from one of the poorest branches, Albert rose to become one of the most powerful barons during Sigismund's reign, due to his regular military engagements and influential allies. He served as Prior of Vrana from 1417 to 1433. Beside that, he was also Ban of Croatia from 1419 to 1426. In 1418, Sigismund donated a coat-of-arms to the entire Nagymihály branch upon his request. Beside that, the monarch re-donated all the estates in hand to the kindred, whose legal status has thus become uniform. As a result, when Jakó's branch became extinct in 1449, previously acquired estates could remain in the hands of the Andrew's branch, and the estates did not escheated to the crown.

Family tree

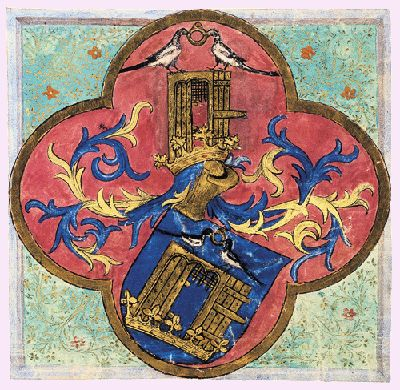
Coat of arms of Albert Nagymihályi, Ban of Croatia

- Jakó I (fl. 1243–1263) ∞ Catherine, daughter of Peter (fl. 1244–1258)
  - Andrew I (fl. 1249–1302)
    - Lawrence (fl. 1307–1350, d. before 1353) ∞ daughter of magister Kakas (fl. 1353)
      - Tibai, Sztáray (Sztárai) and Lucskai families
    - Jakó IV (fl. 1320–1337) ∞ Anne N (fl. 1345–1353)
      - John II (fl. 1335–1376, d. before 1378) → Gézsény sub-branch
        - Gregory (fl. 1358–1376, d. before 1380)
          - Ladislaus III (fl. 1380–1386) ∞ Elizabeth Olcsvári (fl. 1398)
          - George (fl. 1380)
          - Albert ("Ungi"; fl. 1380–1433, d. before 1434)
            - Bánfi (Bánffy) de Nagymihály (or Priorfi) family
        - Andrew IV (fl. 1373–1396)
        - Denis II (fl. 1374)
      - Andrew III (fl. 1335–1342)
      - James I (fl. 1335–1342)
      - Ernye (fl. 1335–1349, d. before 1353)
        - Edmund (fl. 1353–1393) ∞ Elizabeth Butkai
          - Ödönfi de Nagymihály family
      - Clara (d. before 1345) ∞ Stephen Szeretvai
    - Michael (fl. 1328–1373)
      - Pongrácz de Nagymihály family
    - Catherine (fl. 1331) ∞ Nicholas Pok
    - Anne (fl. 1364) ∞ Peter Lipóci
  - Jakó II (fl. 1249–1311) → Nagymihályi family
    - Andrew II (fl. 1307–1342)
      - Emeric (fl. 1335–1379) ∞ Catherine Butkai (1376†) (Note: She was murdered by her own husband, Emeric Nagymihályi, after allegedly being caught in adultery.)
        - Petronilla (fl. 1389)
      - Stephen I (fl. 1335–1384) ∞ Helena Szeretvai (fl. 1398)
        - Andrew V (fl. 1382–1394)
        - Ladislaus IV (fl. 1384–1396)
          - John V (fl. 1411–1428) ∞ Ursula N (fl. 1444–1449)
            - Ladislaus V (fl. 1416–1449†), last male member ∞ Helena Keresztúri (fl. 1449–1472)
          - Andrew VII (fl. 1411–1422, d. before 1428) ∞ Dorothea Várdai (fl. 1428–1454)
        - Stephen II (fl. 1388–1396†, Battle of Nicopolis)
          - Andrew VI (fl. 1398, d. before 1416) ∞ Anne N (fl. 1416)
      - Nicholas I (fl. 1335–1358)
    - John I (d. before 1311)
    - Ladislaus I (fl. 1307–1360) ∞ unidentified, then Clara Ráskai (fl. 1356–1373)
      - (1) John III (fl. 1335–1352) ∞ Helena Mezőlaki (fl. 1356)
        - Euphrosyne (1358)
      - (1) Jakó V (fl. 1335–1346)
      - (1) Thomas (fl. 1337–1346)
      - (1) Ladislaus II (fl. 1346)
      - (1) Denis I (fl. 1346)
      - (2) James II (fl. 1346–1412)
        - John IV (fl. 1393–1419, d. before 1421) ∞ unidentified (fl. 1421–1427)
      - (2) Peter (fl. 1356–1357)
      - (2) Nicholas II (fl. 1356–1423, d. before 1428) ∞ Elizabeth Sós de Sóvár (fl. 1423–1428)
        - Clara (fl. 1416) ∞ John Csetneki
      - (2) Anne (fl. 1356–1373) ∞ Peter Somosi
    - Jakó III (or Stephen; fl. 1307–1328)
    - Elizabeth (fl. 1311–1335) ∞ Thomas Szeretvai (fl. 1311), then Nicholas Csicseri (fl. 1335)
    - a daughter (d. before 1345) ∞ Thomas Kendi

=== Imreg branch ===
Its members lived in Imreg in Zemplén County (present-day Brehov, Slovakia) until 1350. They also possessed the nearby Céke (present-day Cejkov, Slovakia), where the branch erected a castle sometime in the 13th century. The first known member of the branch was Denis (I), there is no record of his activity outside of his name. He had two sons, Desiderius and Andrew. They jointly possessed Sályi in Szatmár County in 1301. In that year, they exchanged the estate for Varsány with Peter Csaholyi from the gens Káta. Desiderius, additionally, is mentioned by two sources in 1307 and 1309. Accordingly, he had two servants named Prebardus and Nicholas, sons of Golach in this period before releasing them from service. He plausibly died soon, because his only son Stephen acted as sole owner of the properties alongside his uncle Andrew in 1311.

Andrew exchanged his estates Varsány and Emőcsteleke in Szabolcs County for Géres, Őrös (present-day Veľký Horeš and Strážne in Slovakia, respectively) and Gerebse (today a borough of Strážne) in Zemplén County to the three sons – Nicholas, Stephen and Vid – of the late Paul Gutkeled in 1310. In the next year, Andrew exchanged the newly acquired villages – Őrös and Gerebse – for Szürnyeg and Kiszte in Zemplén County (today Sirník and Kysta in Slovakia, respectively) with members of the Tárkányi family. His both new settlements located near Imreg. Andrew's nephew, Stephen approved the transaction. As a loyal partisan of King Charles I, Andrew participated in the sieges of Komárom and Sempte (today Šintava, Slovakia) against the rebellious Matthew Csák in 1317. He acquired the village Gerel, located in the area between the rivers Tisza and Takta, for 90 marks. In 1323, he exchanged his estate Ilk in Szatmár County for Kamonya in Zemplén County with Paul Butkai (son of the aforementioned Nicholas Gutkeled). Andrew married Catherine Lónyai. Through his two sons – Ladislaus and Denis (II) – they were ancestors of the Cékei and Imregi noble families, which became extinct in 1511 and around 1461, respectively. His daughter Elizabeth was the wife of John Forrói. They had no offspring.

Family tree

- Denis I
  - Desiderius (fl. 1301–1309)
    - Stephen (fl. 1311)
  - Andrew (fl. 1301–1323) ∞ Catherine Lónyai
    - Ladislaus (fl. 1340–1366) ∞ Magyth Perényi (fl. 1340)
      - Cékei family
    - Denis II (fl. 1351–1370)
      - Imregi family
    - Elizabeth (fl. 1356) ∞ John Forrói (fl. 1319–1356)

=== Sályi branch ===
Only one charter (from 1277) mentions the existence of this branch. Its members possessed Sályi in Szatmár County. According to the document, the unidentified widows of Dés (I) and his son Denis declared that the latter bequeathed the estate to his sisters shortly before his death; Proxya (Euphrosyne?) was the widow of Alexander Miskolc, while Elizabeth married Alexander Toronyai (they were ancestors of the Császlóci family from Ung County). The two sons – Mike and Dés (II) – of the late Denis and his wife were still minors during the act. By 1301, as mentioned above, the Imreg branch possessed the estate, thus, a closer relationship can be assumed between the two branches compared to the other branches.

Family tree

- Dés I (d. before 1277) ∞ unidentified (fl. 1277)
  - Denis (d. before 1277) ∞ unidentified (fl. 1277)
    - Mike (fl. 1277)
    - Dés II (fl. 1277)
  - Proxya (fl. 1277) ∞ Alexander Miskolc (d. before 1277)
  - Elizabeth (fl. 1277) ∞ Alexander Toronyai (fl. 1276–1317)

=== Papos branch ===
By the mid-13th century, some branches of the Kaplon kindred possessed landholdings also in Bereg County. The so-called Papos branch owned, for instance, Tákos, Papos and Pátroha. The Tákosi (also known as Paposi or Mikai) and the Barlabássy families descended from this branch. The latter kinship became prominent landowners in Transylvania by the mid-15th century.

Family tree

- N
  - Alexander
    - Tákosi (also Paposi or Mikai) family
  - (?) Nicholas
    - Barlabássy family

=== Vitka branch ===
This branch lived in Vitka in Bereg County (present-day a borough of Vásárosnamény). They also possessed a portion in the surrounding Varsány in Szatmár County. The sons of Michael objected against that decision, when Andrew from the Imreg branch (see above) exchanged his portion in the same village. The so-called Pilis sub-branch also belonged to the Vitka branch. Its member Andrew verified with the Károly and Papos branches of the clan that he was also affiliated with the Kaplon clan. He lived in Pilis, near to Nyírbátor in Szabolcs County. The Vitkai (or Witkay) family descended from the branch. Its male line became extinct in 1560.

=== Terebes branch ===
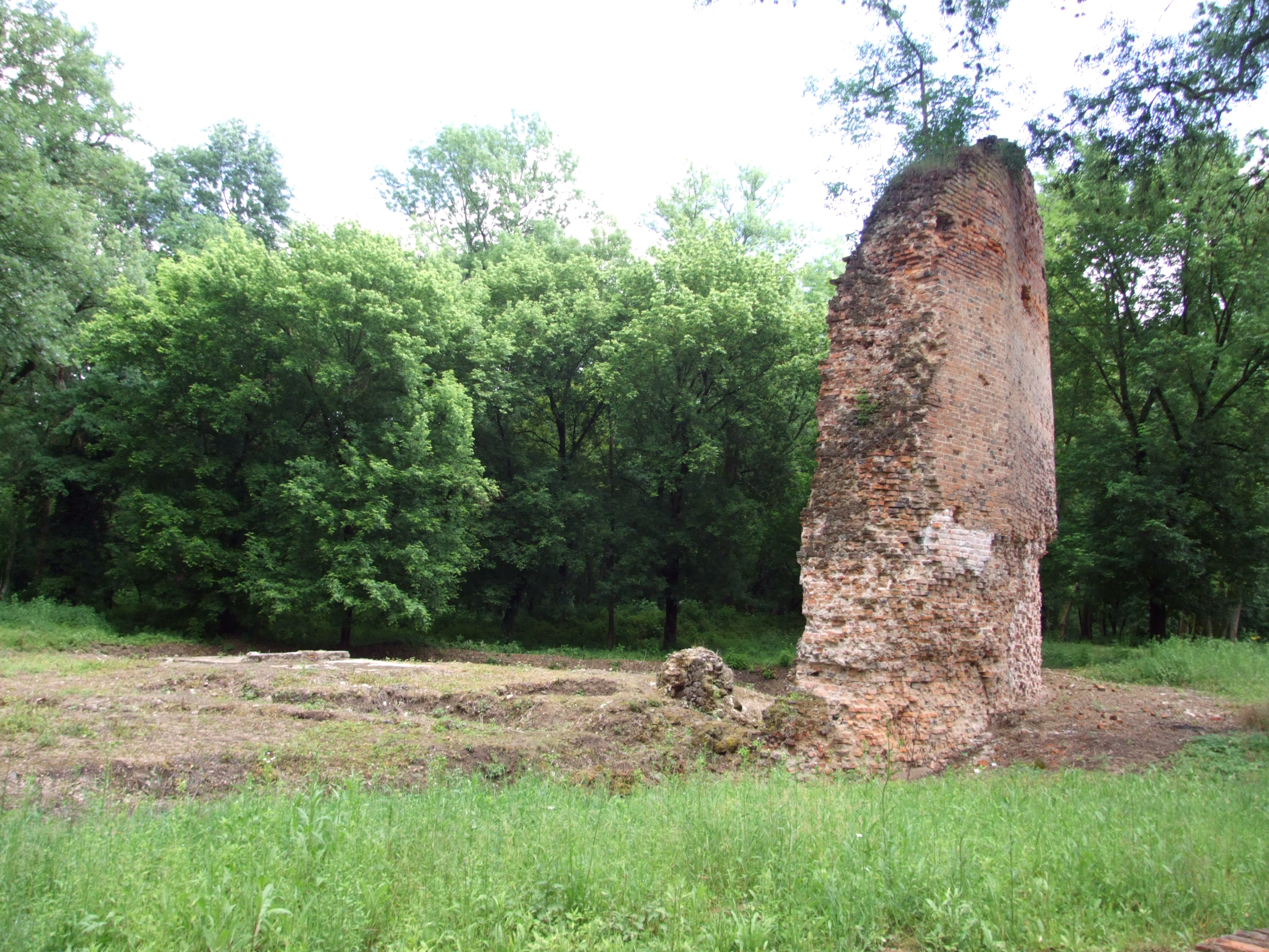
Ruins of Parič (Parics) Castle in the Trebišov park, Slovakia

The only known branch which had landholdings in Transdanubia. Its member, John, son of Andronicus (I) sold his inherited estate Szántó in Zala County for 110 marks to his "relative", cleric Zlaudus Ják in 1236. The purchase resulted a lawsuit with the neighboring udvornici, because the boundaries of the estate were disputed. Because of this, both Zlaudus and John confirmed their contract in 1251 before the collegiate chapter of Székesfehérvár, requesting its confirmation. Since the document calls them relatives, earlier historiography attached Zlaudus and his entire kinship to the Kaplon kindred. However, György Rácz proved that the future bishop belonged to the prestigious Ják clan. Plausibly, the two noblemen were related through in-laws or maternal side. John had an unidentified sister, who was the widow of a certain Peter, son of Fuurh in 1248, when she was granted her dowry by the cathedral chapter of Esztergom.

John's son was Andronicus (II), who possessed Terebes in Zemplén County (present-day Trebišov, Slovakia). Sometime in the second half of the 13th century, he built a castle stood at the border of the village called Parics (Parič). In 1300, Andronicus exchanged his village Horhi in Veszprém County for Gercsely in Zemplén County (today Hrčeľ, Slovakia), which laid near Terebes, with Lawrence Igmánd. Andronicus had a son Ladislaus. It is possible that he supported the rebellion of the Aba clan and Peter, son of Petenye in the region, therefore Charles I confiscated Parics Castle from the family in 1318 and handed it over to Philip Drugeth, his faithful confidant and the new de facto lord of Northeastern Hungary, in the next year.

Family tree

- Andronicus I
  - John (fl. 1236–1251)
    - Andronicus II (fl. 1300)
      - Ladislaus (fl. 1300–1318)
  - a daughter (fl. 1248) ∞ Peter, son of Fuurh

=== Other members ===
The following members were certainly belonged to the Kaplon clan, but their names cannot be attached to any branch.

- Christopher acted as pristaldus ("bailiff") of Emeric, King of Hungary, when handed over the royal forests of Kékes and Fentős in Szatmár County to Thomas Hont-Pázmány, progenitor of the Szentgyörgyi family in 1203.
- An unidentified member of the clan had a servant named Karácson in Málca (today Malčice, Slovakia), who was accused of theft in 1213. The Regestrum Varadinense refers to the servant as "ioubagionem de genere Cupulon, scilicet Crachinum".
- Peter, son of Mohc claimed the estate Gelénes in Szatmár County for himself in 1234, citing his affiliation with the Kaplon clan. He wanted to assert his truth in arms against his neighbor, the widow of Stephen Káta.
- Anne, a daughter of Rubinus and Itois, was the widow of Nicholas from the gens (clan) Koppán in 1267. Her mother and she were granted a portion in Gyarmat in Komárom County (present-day a wasteland in Gyermely) as part of their dower. They donated the estate Lucas Pok and his sons in that year.
- Kaplon, son of Mikó, was a supporter of rex iunior Stephen in 1268. He installed Alexander Karászi to his new properties in Szatmár County on behalf of Stephen. He again acted as a royal pristaldus in 1272, when determined the borders of Hetény (today Hodász) before handing it over to its new owner, Álmos, the ispán of Ugocsa County and Erdőd royal forest. Kaplon died before 1279. His estate Gelénes was inherited by the Nagymihály branch. Consequently, János Karácsonyi considered that his father Mikó was perhaps a brother of Jakó (I) from the aforementioned branch. Kaplon's unidentified widow released her German servant from her service before the cathedral chapter of Várad (today Oradea, Romania) in 1284.
- Two members of the kindred, Vinchlo and Gregory sold their portions in Bere in 1288.
- James, a son of Alexander sold his estate Mór before the testimony of the Knights Hospitaller in Esztergom in 1298.

== Sources ==
- Engel, Pál (1996). Magyarország világi archontológiája, 1301–1457, I. [Secular Archontology of Hungary, 1301–1457, Volume I] (in Hungarian). História, MTA Történettudományi Intézete. ISBN 963-8312-44-0.
- Engel, Pál (1998). A nemesi társadalom a középkori Ung megyében [The Noble Society in Medieval Ung County] (in Hungarian). Társadalom- és művelődéstörténeti tanulmányok 25., MTA Történettudományi Intézete. ISBN 963-8312-59-9.
- F. Romhányi, Beatrix (2000). Kolostorok és társaskáptalanok a középkori Magyarországon: Katalógus [Monasteries and Collegiate Chapters in Medieval Hungary: A Catalogue] (in Hungarian). Pytheas. ISBN 963-7483-07-1.
- Karácsonyi, János (1901). A magyar nemzetségek a XIV. század közepéig. II. kötet [The Hungarian genera until the middle of the 14th century, Vol. 2] (in Hungarian). Hungarian Academy of Sciences.
- Németh, Péter (2008). A középkori Szatmár megye települései a 15. század elejéig [Settlements of the medieval Szatmár County until the early 15th century] (in Hungarian). Jósa András Múzeum Kiadványai 60. ISBN 978-963-7220-63-0.
- Rácz, György (2000). "A Ják nemzetség és monostoralapításai I. rész [The Ják Kindred and their Foundations of Monasteries: Volume I]". Vasi Szemle (in Hungarian). 54 (1): 7–26. ISSN 0505-0332.
- Sebők, Ferenc (1994). "Kaplony nem [Genus Kaplon]". In Kristó, Gyula; Engel, Pál; Makk, Ferenc (eds.). Korai magyar történeti lexikon (9-14. század) [Encyclopedia of the Early Hungarian History (9th-14th centuries)] (in Hungarian). Akadémiai Kiadó. pp. 324–325. ISBN 963-05-6722-9.
- Zsoldos, Attila (2011). Magyarország világi archontológiája, 1000–1301 [Secular Archontology of Hungary, 1000–1301] (in Hungarian). História, MTA Történettudományi Intézete. ISBN 978-963-9627-38-3.
