= Bagossy family =

House of Bagossy
- Parent house: Genus Kaplon
- Country: Kingdom of Hungary
- Founded: 13th century

Bagossy de Bagos et Kaplony (or Bagosi) was a Hungarian noble family from the kindred of Kaplon. The family was located in Szatmár County.

== History ==
The first known ancestor was Andrew, who lived in the early 12th century. His son, Simon Ördög, is mentioned in contemporary sources from 1264. Simon had four sons: Andrew, the forefather of the Károlyi family, Endus, Mikó and Peter. Peter had three children with Anna, the daughter of Lawrence Széplaki from the kindred of Turul: Peter Zonga, the ancestor of the Vetési family (or Vetéssy); Martin, the ancestor of the Csomaközy family; and John who founded the Bagossy family.

The family estate was Csengerbagos (today: Boghiș, Romania). In 1354, Louis I of Hungary granted them the right of blood court. Later, Sigismund confirmed their jurisdictional privileges along with the Vetési family in 1409. The Diet of Szatmáry Country were held several times (e. g. 1306 and 1718) in Csengerbagos. The Bagossys also built a church in the 15th century. László Bagossy settled Vlachs in 1731.

== Coat of arms ==
In a round blue shield surrounded by a green dragon, a black eagle (or sparrow hawk) stands in a triple green hill and turns rights to extending wings and holds a red heart in his right leg. Maybe the Bagossy de Dancsháza was originated as the branch of this family.

== Notable members ==
- Mihály, judge of the Tabula Regia in the Diet of Rákos (1505)
- Pál, vice-ispán of Szatmár County (1603–1608)
- Pál, Kuruc general, vice-captain of Szentjobb
- László, vice-ispán of Szatmár County (1714–1727; 1734)

== Sources ==
- Pallas Great lexicon
- János Karácsonyi: A magyar nemzetségek a XIV. század közepéig. Budapest: Magyar Tudományos Akadémia. 1900–1901.
- Samu Borovszki: Szatmár vármegye.
