= Károlyi Palace, Budapest (Reviczky Street) =

Building in Budapest, Hungary

Károlyi Palace
- Károlyi-Csekonics-palota
- Palotanegyed, Budapest, Hungary
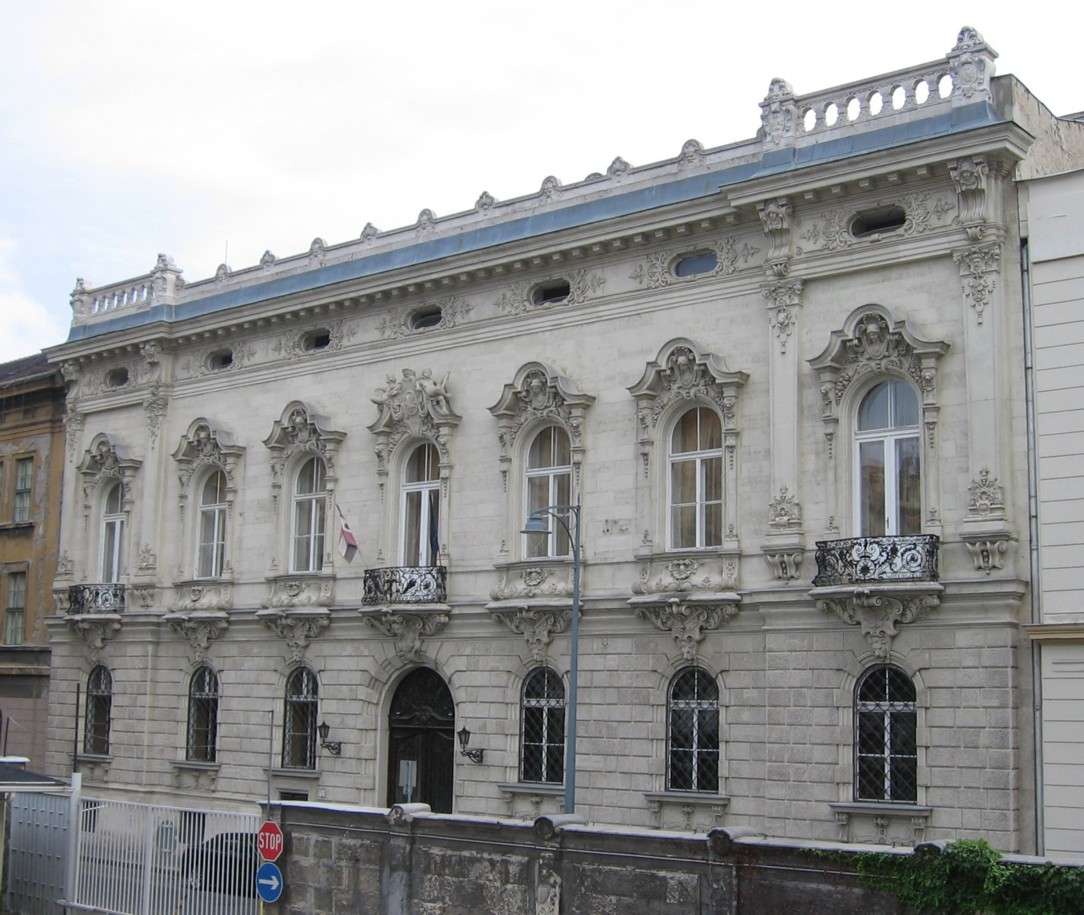
- The Palace, January 2004

Site information
- Type: Palace
- Owner: Government of Hungary

Location
- Location of Károlyi Palace in Hungary
- Coordinates: 47°29′25.73″N 19°03′55.54″E

Site history
- Built: 1881, 1890
- Built for: Károlyi family
- Architect: Fellner & Helmer (1881); Arthur Meinig (1890)

Károlyi Palace is a 19th-century palace located at 6 Reviczky Street and 17 Museum Street in Palotanegyed, Budapest, Hungary. The palace was built in classicist and eclectic style by the Károlyi family.

== History ==
The palace, also known as the Károlyi-Csekonics Palace, was built in 1881 for Count István Károlyi and his wife, Margit Csekonics, and was designed by Viennese architects Ferdinand Fellner and Hermann Helmer.

The palace is located in the Palotanegyed neighborhood, in the 8th district of Budapest, on a plot between two streets, with a one-story façade on Museum Street (Hungarian: Múzeum utca) and a four-story façade on Reviczky Street (Hungarian: Reviczky utca), as well as a large inner courtyard. Inside, the wing on Museum Street has a hall, with works by Endre Thék, a courtyard entrance hall, coffered ceilings, and twisted columns. In the 1890s, the grand hall on Reviczky Street was reconstructed by Arthur Meinig.

=== Current use ===
The palace previously housed the Hungarian Government's Office of Public Administration and Justice. Between 2016 and 2020, the palace underwent a complete restoration, with the Museum Street wing converted into an event space and the Reviczky Street wing transformed into a modern educational unit for the Károli Gáspár University of the Reformed Church in Hungary.

== Gallery ==
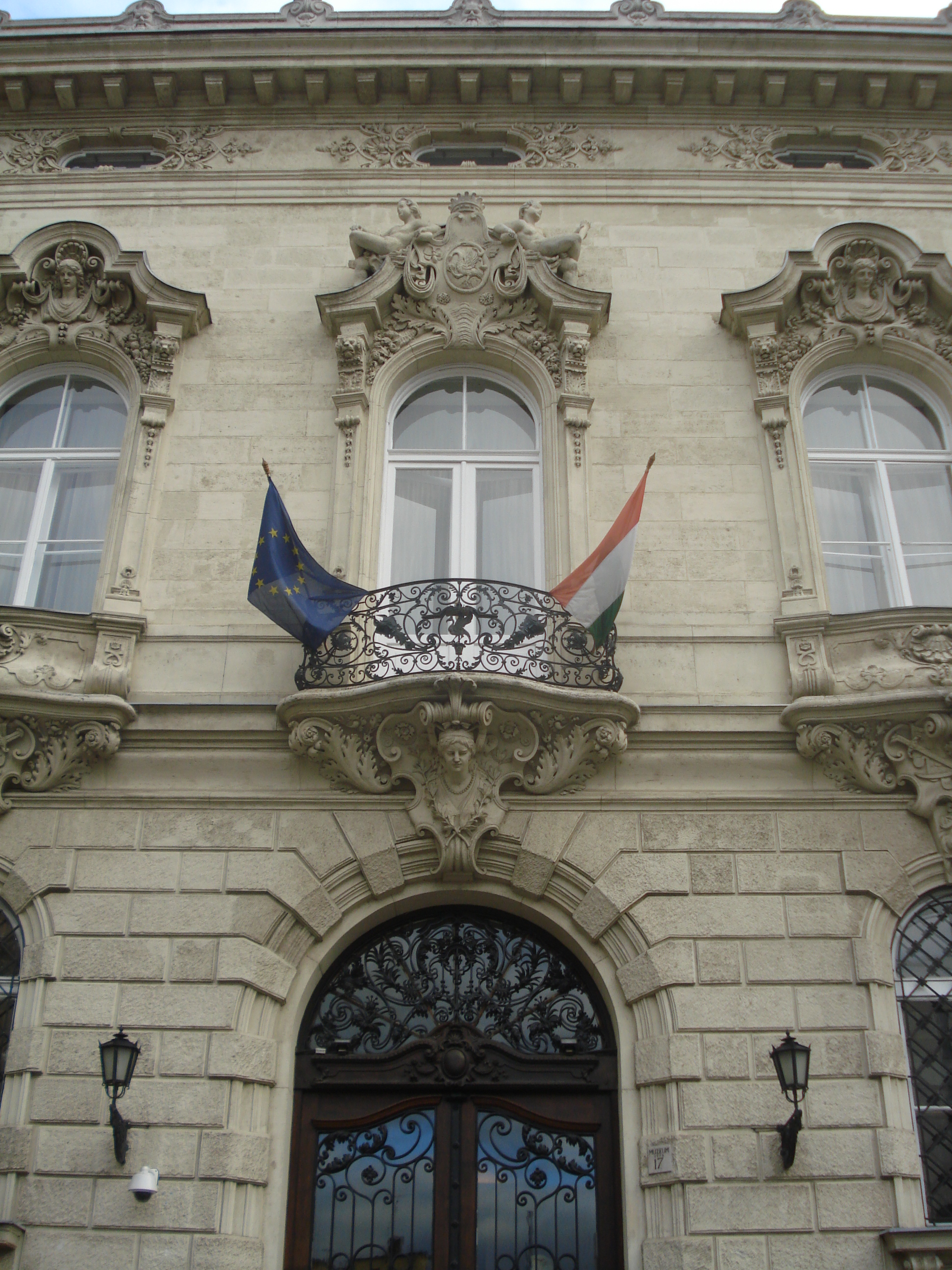

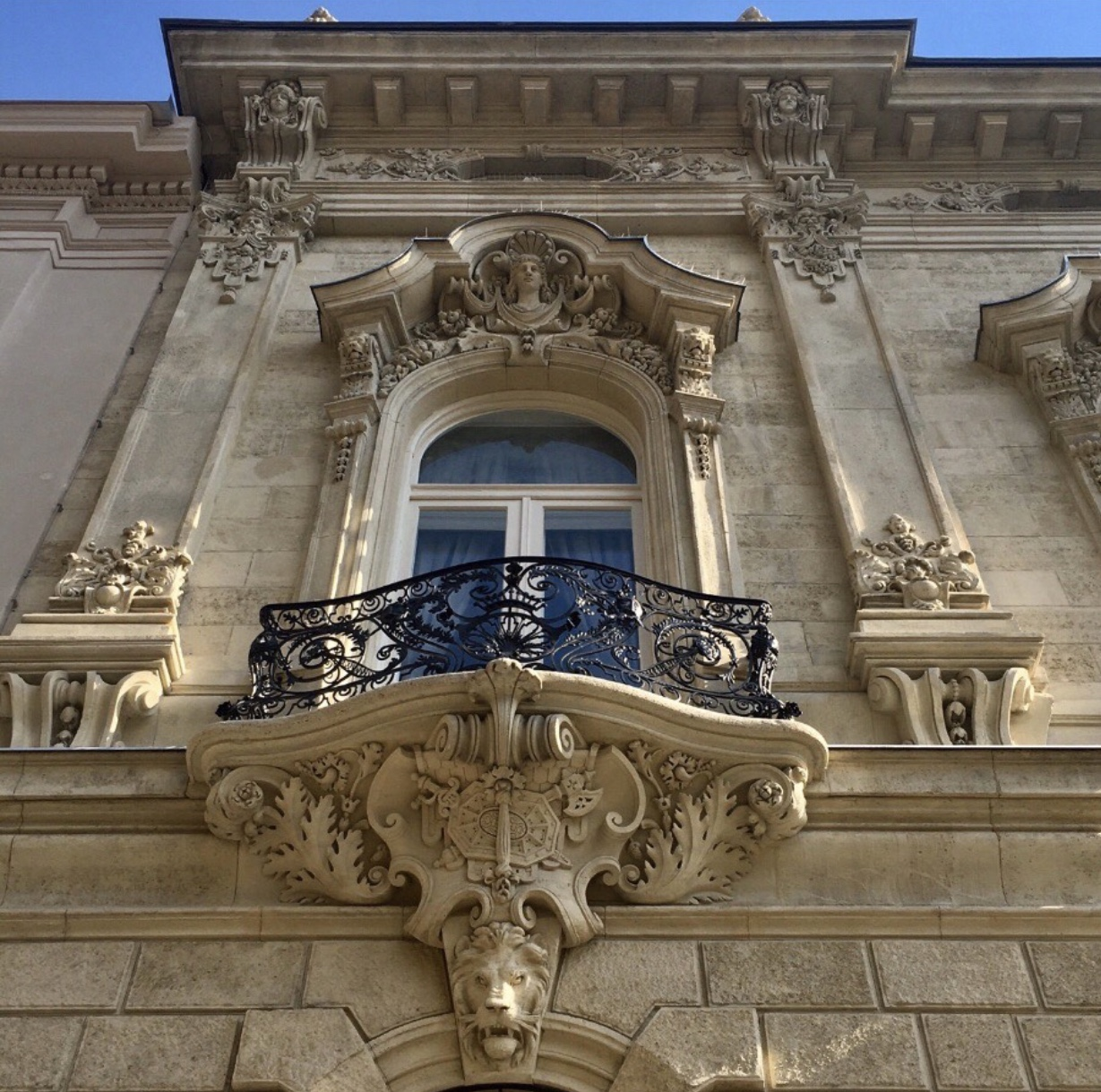

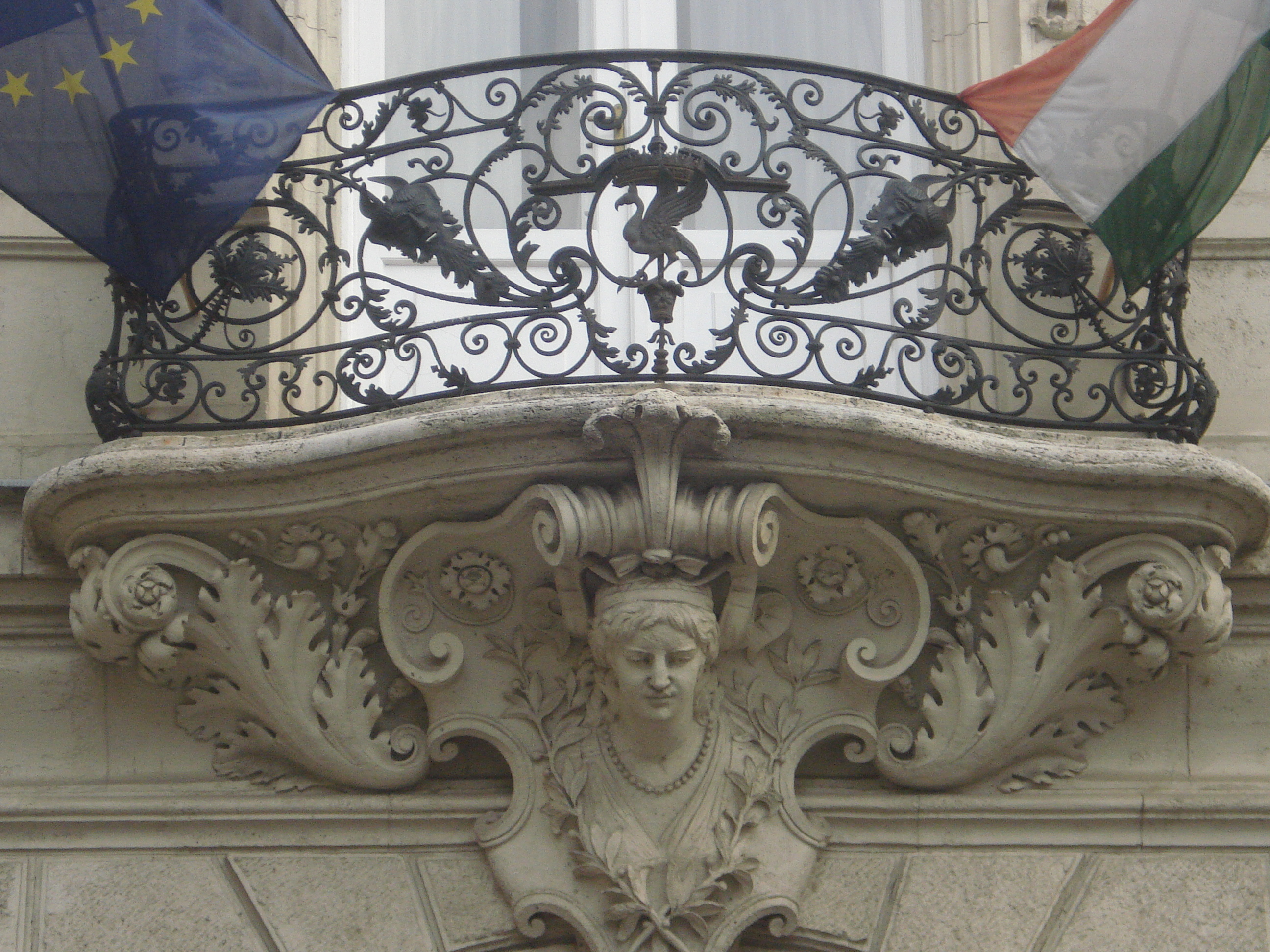

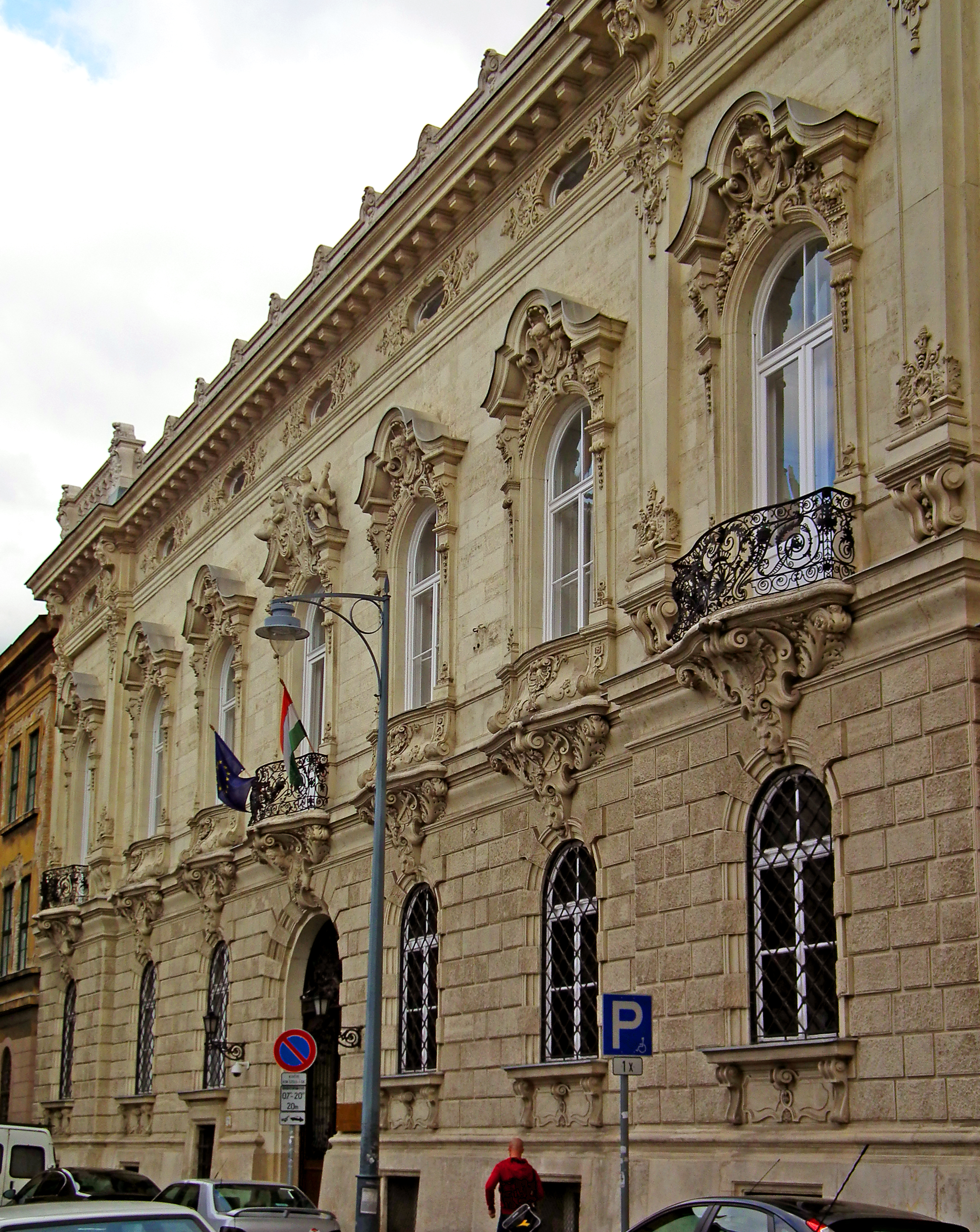
