= Kond (chieftain) =

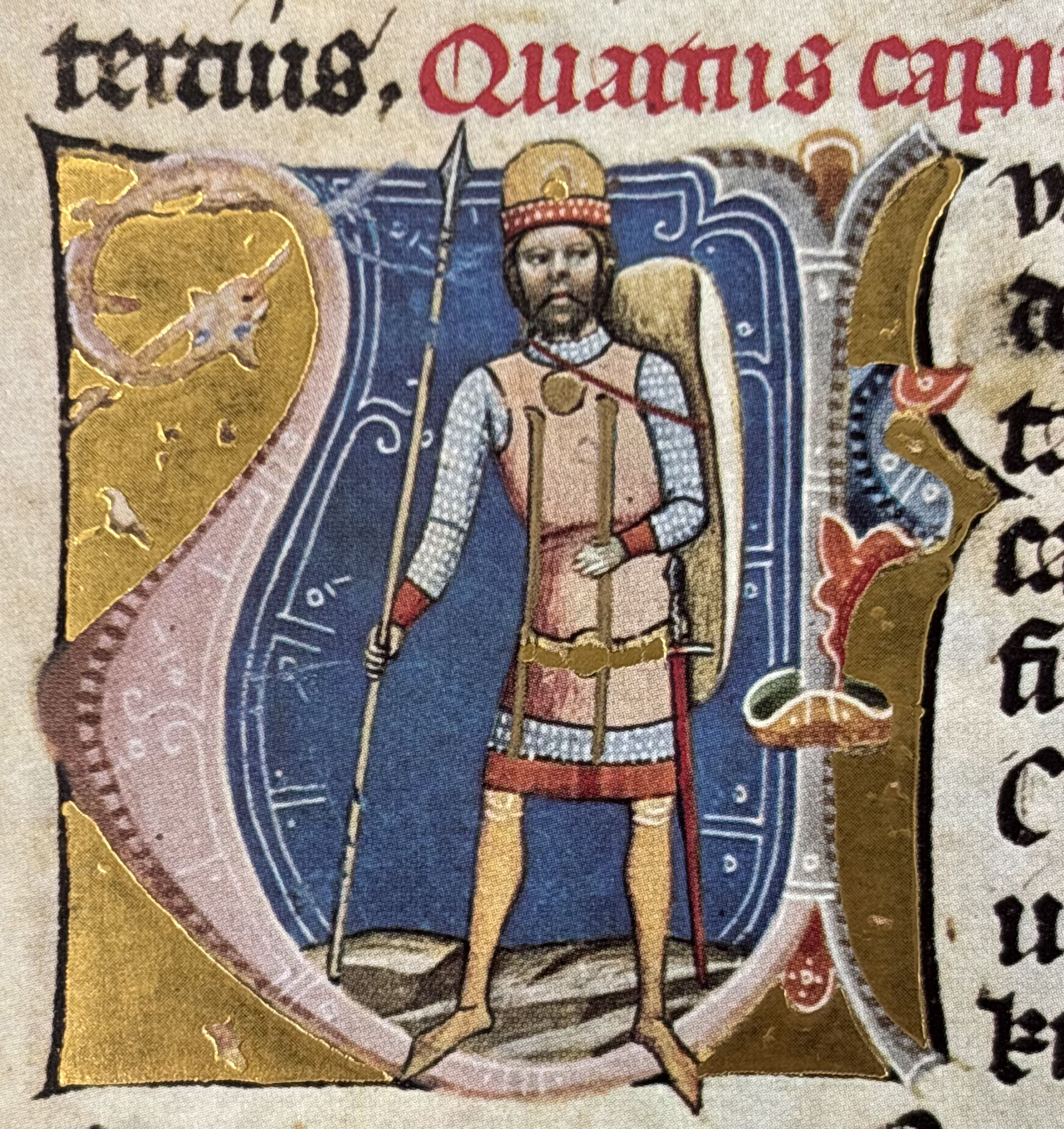
Chieftain Kond (Chronicon Pictum)

Kond (Könd, Künd, Kund, Kend, Kende or Kurszán) was – according to chronicler Anonymus – one of the seven chieftains of the Magyars (Hungarians), who led the Hungarians to the Carpathian Basin in 895.

Probably he was the father of Kurszán. His second son, Kaplon was the founder of the kindred of Kaplon.
