= Károlyi Palace, Budapest (Pollack Mihály Square) =

Károlyi Palace
- Károlyi-palota
- VIII District Palotanegyed, Budapest, Hungary
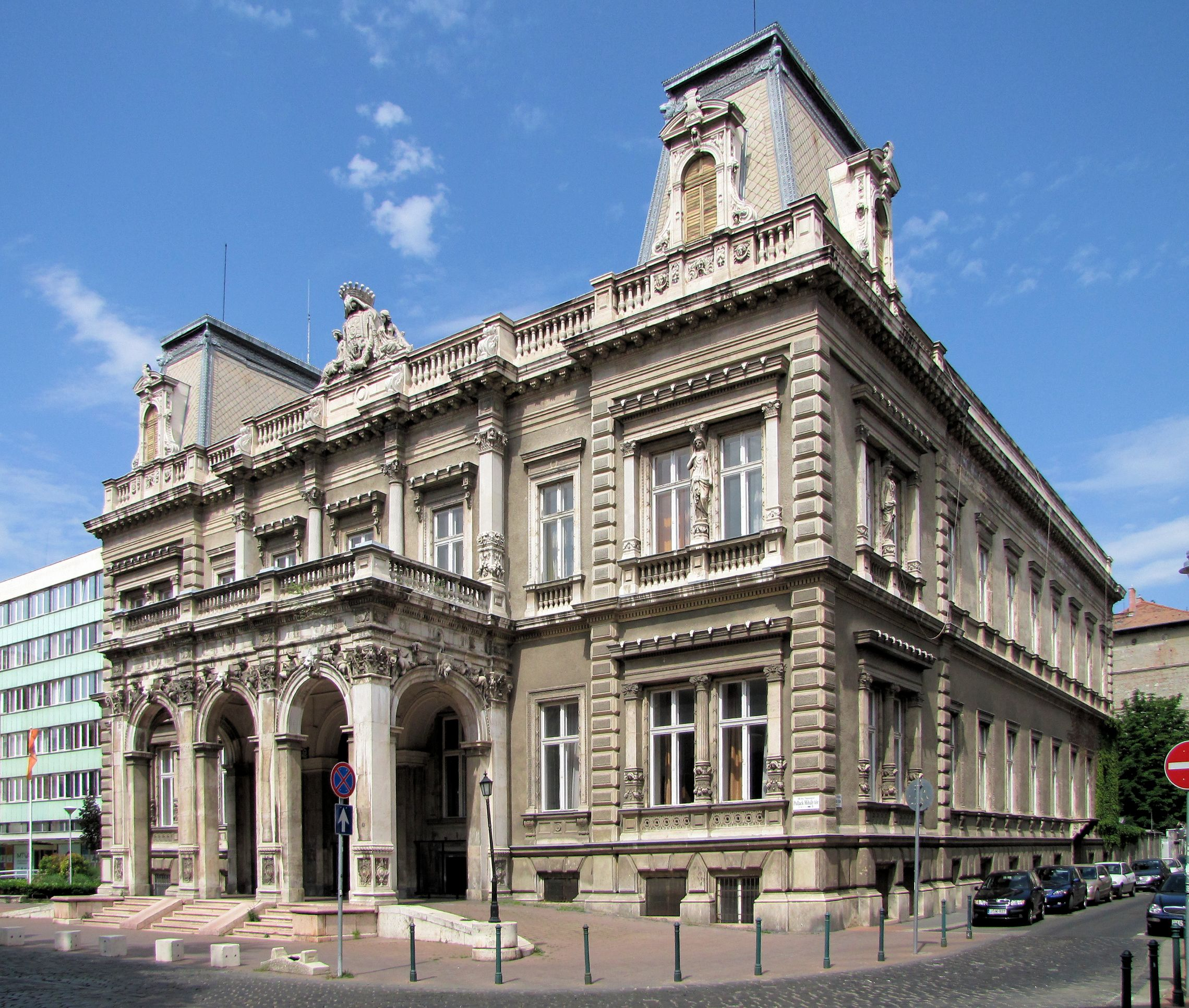
- The Palace, June 2012

Site information
- Type: Palace

Location
- Location of Károlyi Palace in Hungary
- Coordinates: 47°29′26.4″N 19°03′52.28″E

Site history
- Built: 1876
- Built for: Károlyi family
- Architect: Miklós Ybl

Károlyi Palace is a 19th-century palace located in Palotanegyed, Budapest, Hungary. The palace was built in classicist and eclectic style by the Károlyi family.

== History ==
Designed by architect Miklós Ybl, the palace was built by Hungarian Count Alajos Károlyi behind the National Museum in May 1876.

== Gallery ==
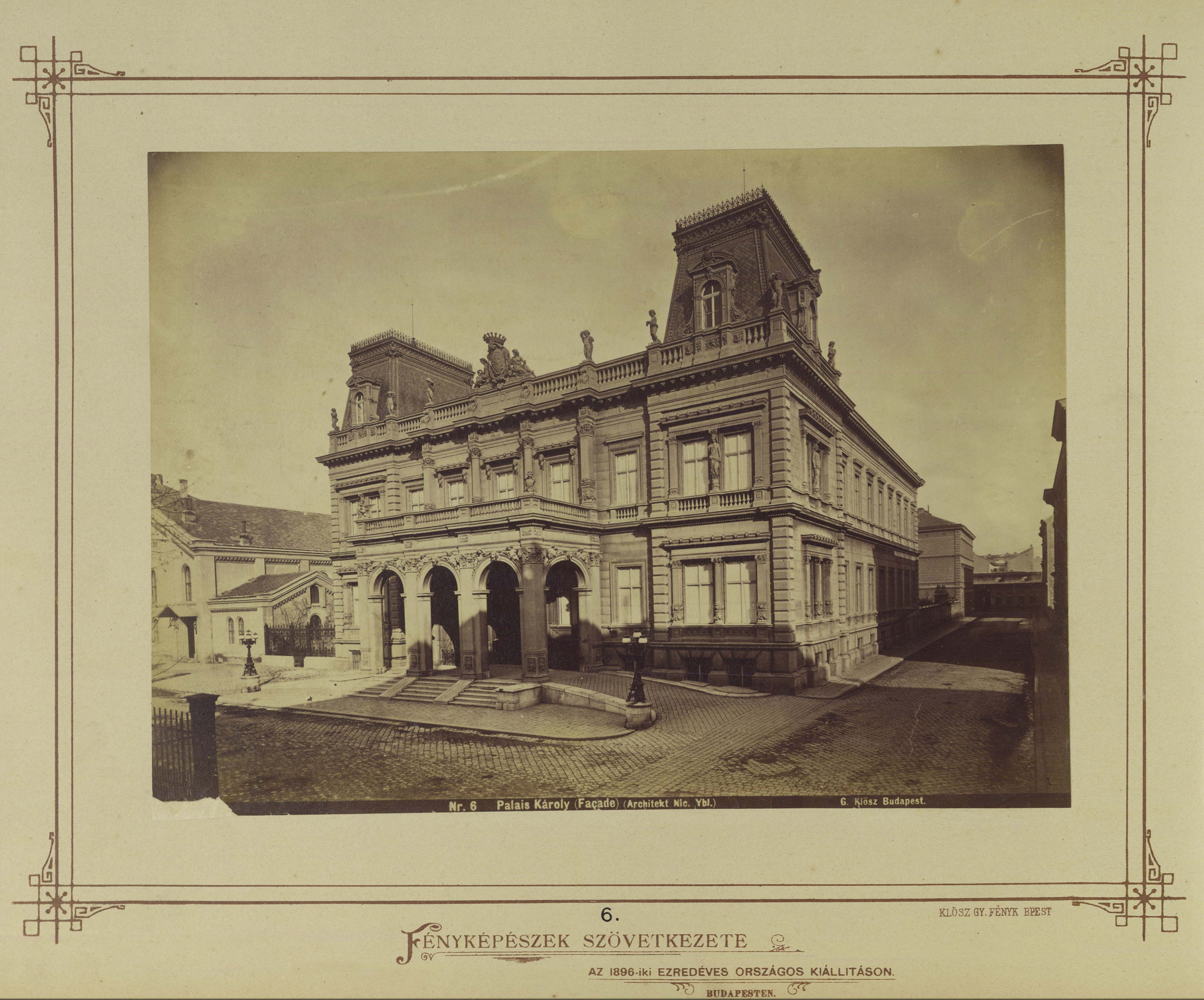

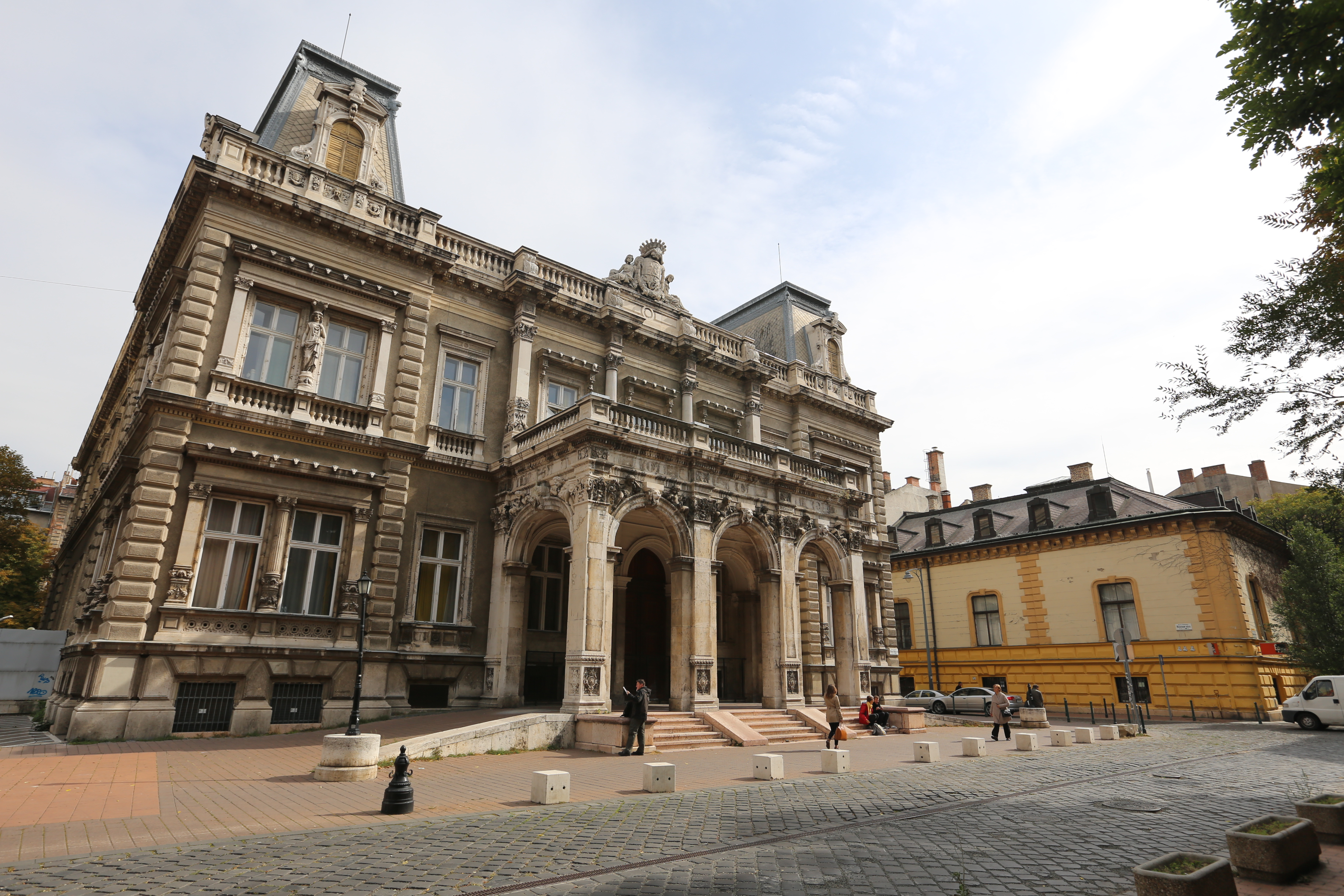

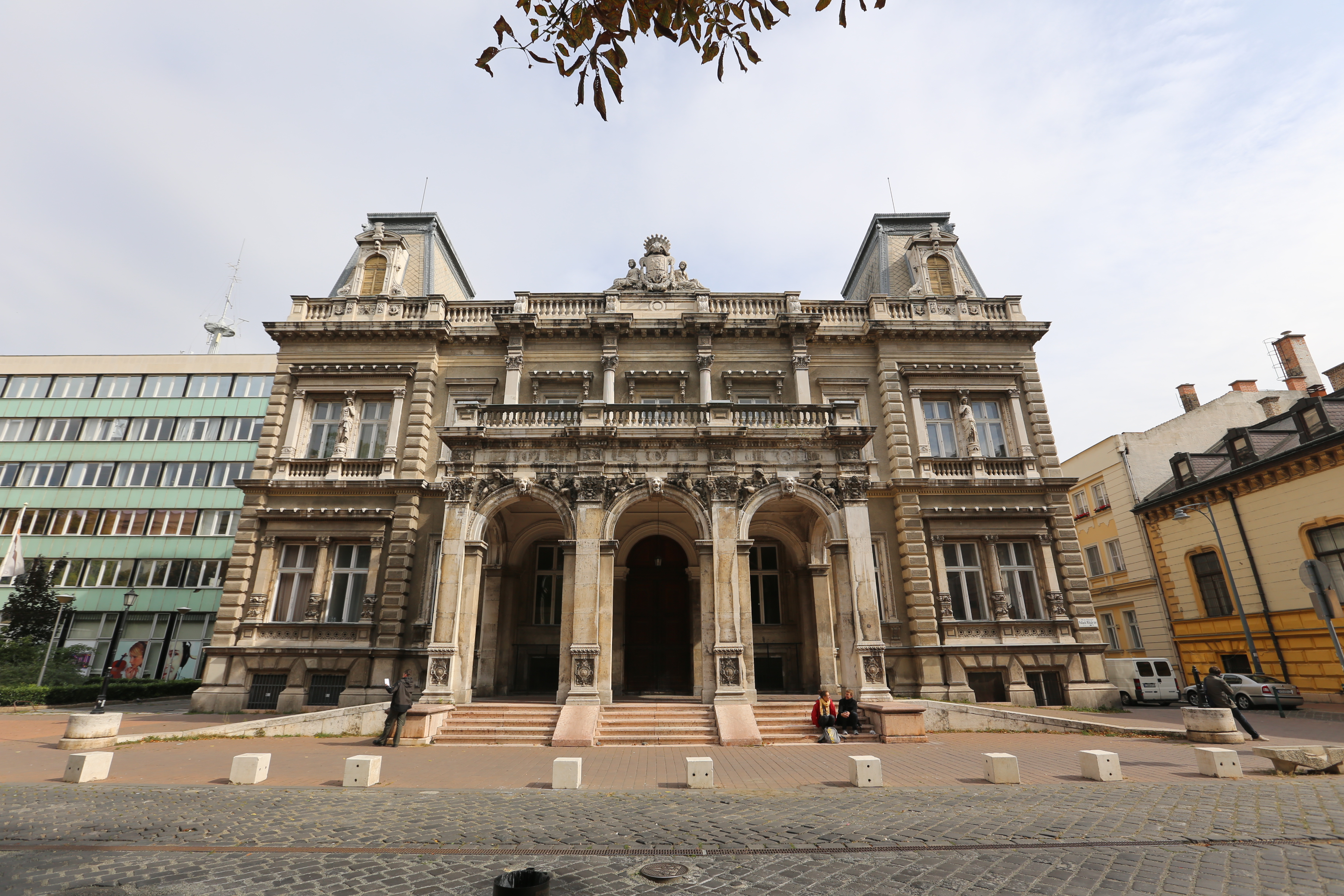

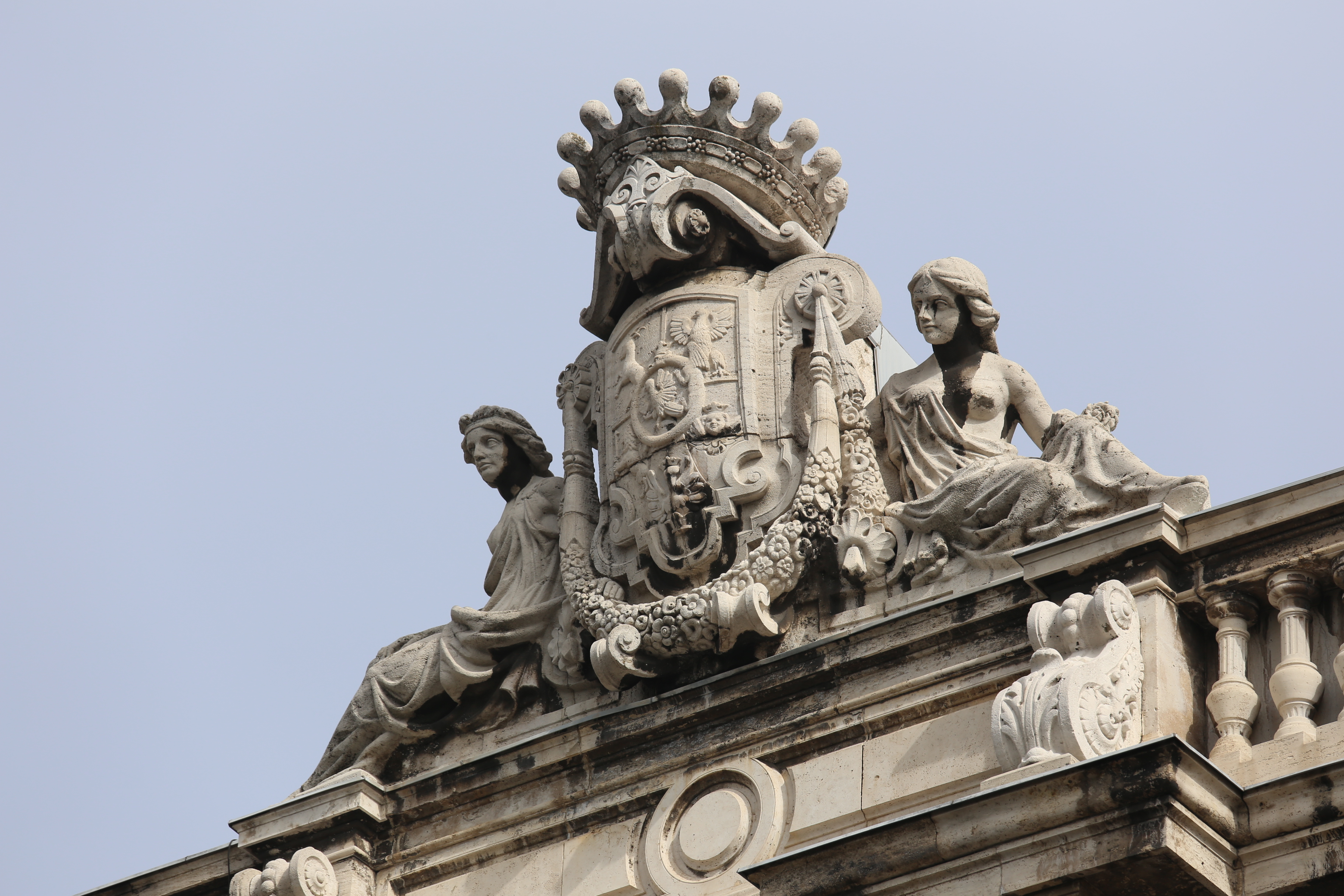

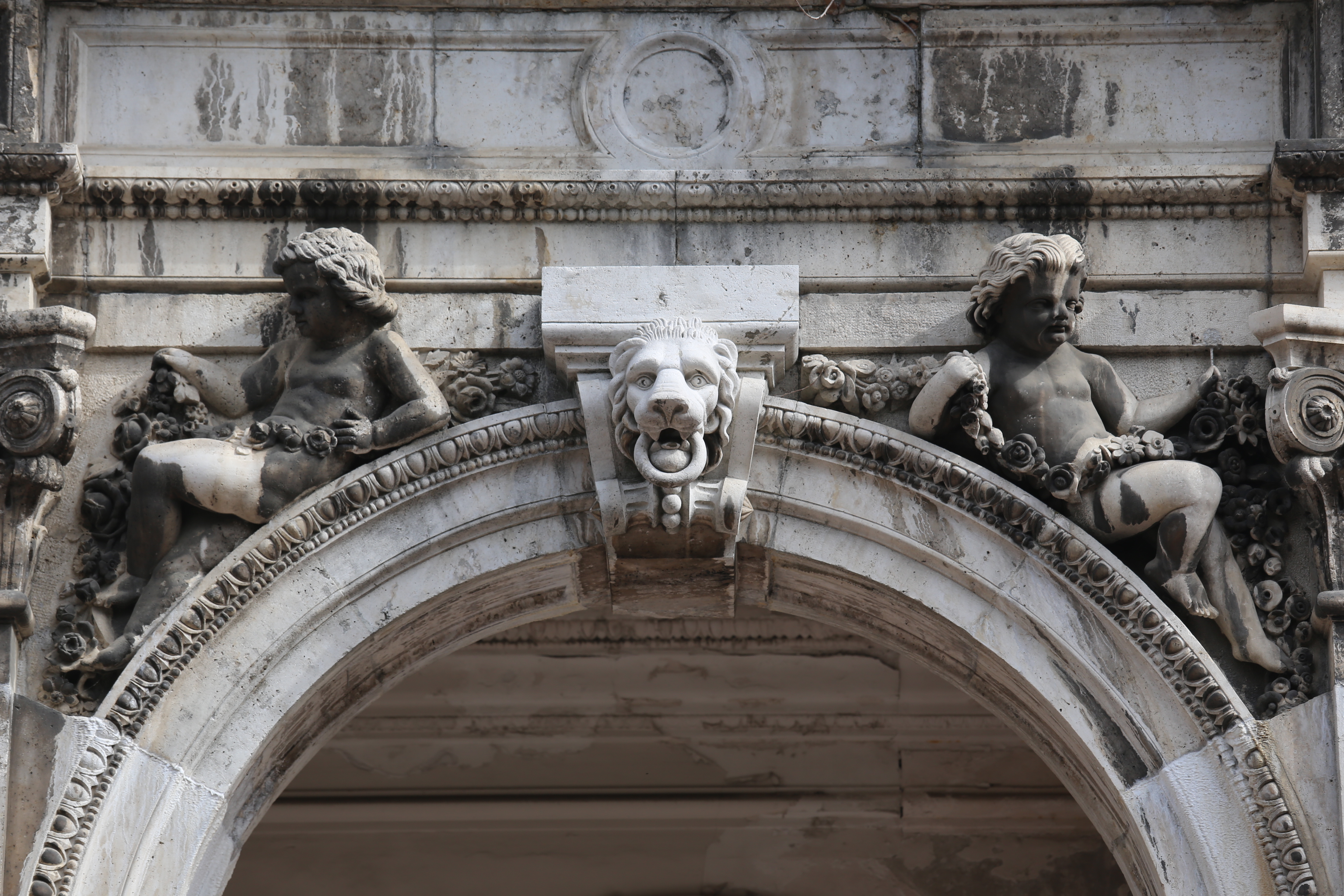

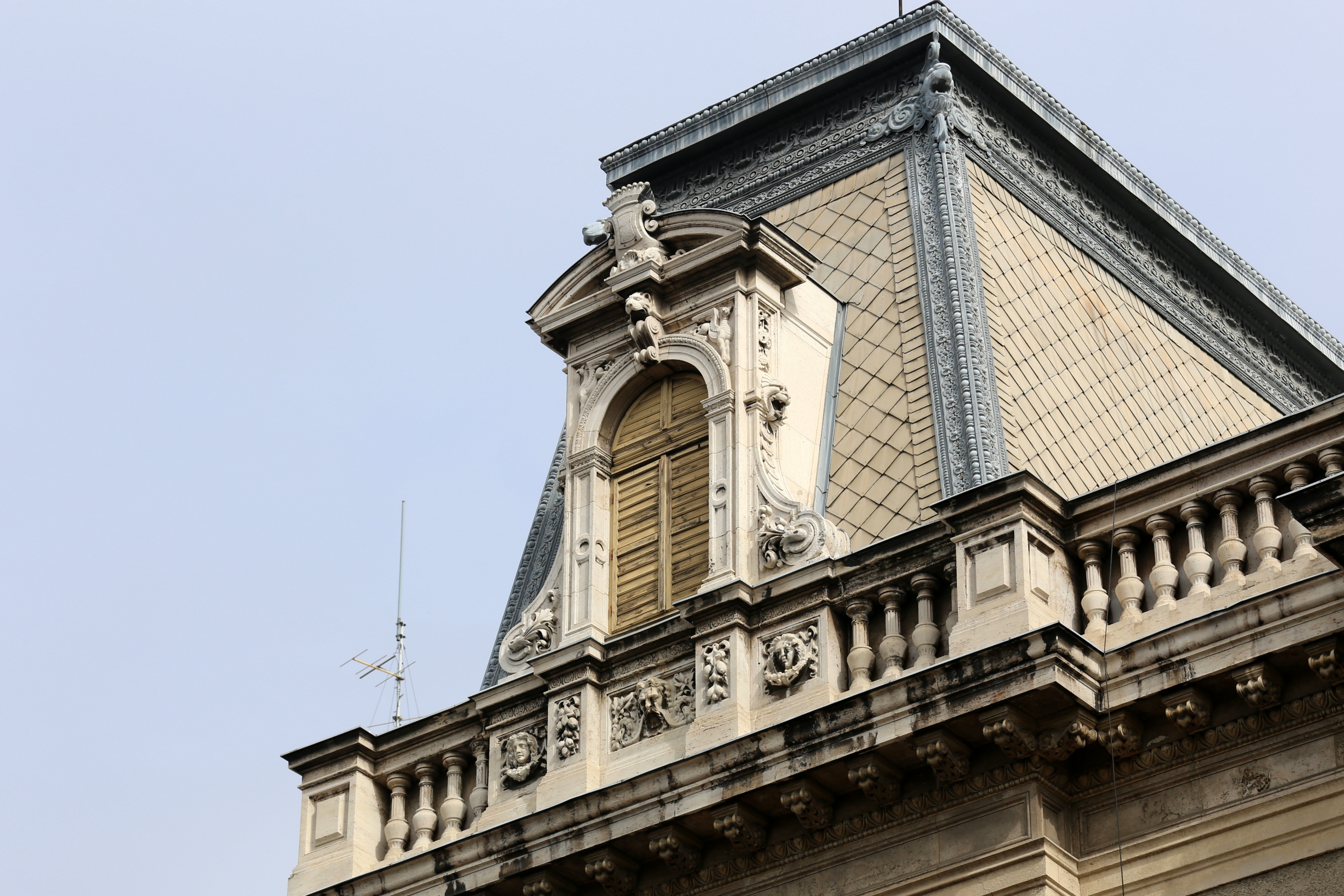
