= Csomaközy family =

House of Csomaközy
- Parent house: Genus Kaplon
- Country: Kingdom of Hungary
- Founded: 14th century
- Estate: Csomaköz
- Dissolution: 1768

The Csomaközi family (later Csomaközy) was a Hungarian noble family from the kindred of Kaplon. The family was located in Szatmár County.

== History ==
The first remaining data about the family is from 1325 when they received the locations of Myke, Kulchia and Elia Kulchia. The family became extinct when Zsigmond Csomaközy died in 1768.

== Sources ==
- János Karácsonyi: A magyar nemzetségek a XIV. század közepéig. Budapest: Magyar Tudományos Akadémia. 1900–1901.
- Samu Borovszki: Szatmár vármegye.
