= Leles =

Leles Lelesz
- Municipality
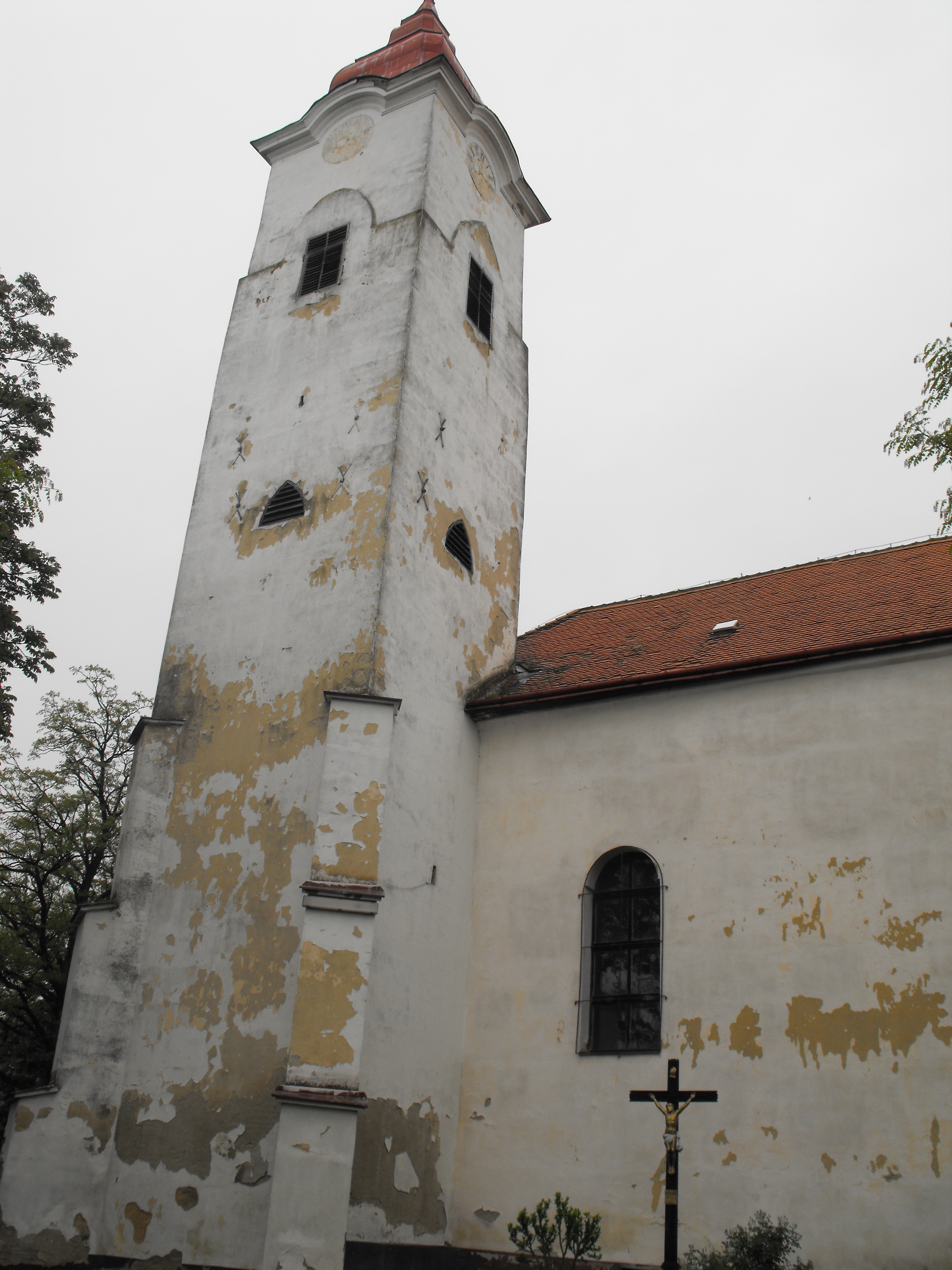
- Leles Monastery in Leles.

- Flag

- Location of Leles in the Košice Region Location of Leles in Slovakia
- Coordinates: 48.47°N 22.03°E
- Country: Slovakia
- Region: Košice Region
- District: Trebišov District
- First mentioned: 1190

Government
  - Mayor: Michal Zurbola (Hungarian Alliance)

Area
  - Total: 33.75 km^{2} (13.03 sq mi)
- Elevation: 108 m (354 ft)

Population (2025)
  - Total: 1,874
- Time zone: UTC+1 (CET)
  - Summer (DST): UTC+2 (CEST)
- Postal code: 768 4
- Area code: +421 56
- Vehicle registration plate (until 2022): TV
- Website: www.obecleles.sk

Leles (Hungarian: Lelesz) is a village and municipality in the Trebišov District in the Košice Region of eastern Slovakia.

== Geography ==
The municipality lies at an altitude of 108 metres (354 ft) and covers an area of 33.75 km^{2} (13.03 sq mi) (2025).

== Population ==
Population statistic (10 years)
Year	1995	2005	2015	2025
Count	1853	1859	1767	1874
Difference		+0.32%	−4.94%	+6.05%

Population statistic
Year	2024	2025
Count	1892	1874
Difference		−0.95%

It has a population of 1874 people (31 December 2025).

=== Ethnicity ===
Census 2021 (1+ %)
Ethnicity	Number	Fraction
Hungarian	1490	78.87%
Slovak	418	22.12%
Not found out	80	4.23%
Romani	25	1.32%
Total	1889	

In year 2021 was 1889 people by ethnicity 1490 as Hungarian, 418 as Slovak, 80 as Not found out, 25 as Romani, 7 as Ukrainian, 5 as Czech, 2 as German and 1 as Russian.

Note on population: The difference values of population numbers in the table "Population statistic" and in the sections "Ethnicity" & "Religion" is caused by the use of various statistical methods.

=== Religion ===
Census 2021 (1+ %)
Religion	Number	Fraction
Roman Catholic Church	1257	66.54%
Greek Catholic Church	170	9%
Calvinist Church	165	8.73%
None	135	7.15%
Not found out	124	6.56%
Jehovah's Witnesses	21	1.11%
Total	1889	

In year 2021 was 1889 people by religion 1257 from Roman Catholic Church, 170 from Greek Catholic Church, 165 from Calvinist Church, 135 from None, 124 from Not found out, 21 from Jehovah's Witnesses, 9 from Evangelical Church, 3 from Eastern Orthodox Church, 2 from Other and not ascertained christian church, 1 from Christian Congregations in Slovakia, 1 from Other and 1 from United Methodist Church.
