= Vinné =

Vinné Vinna
- Municipality
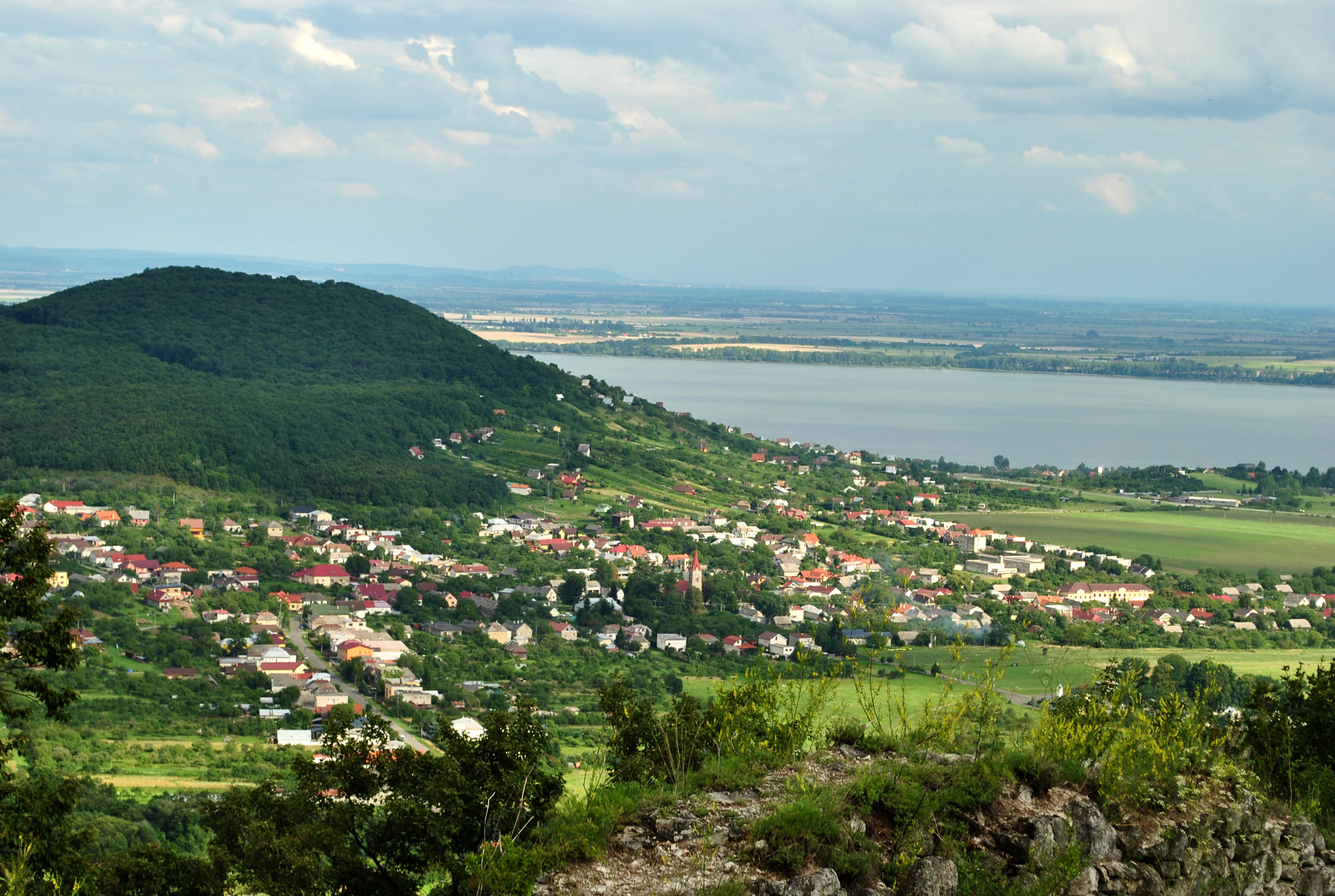

- Flag Coat of arms

- Location of Vinné in the Košice Region Location of Vinné in Slovakia
- Coordinates: 48.81°N 21.97°E
- Country: Slovakia
- Region: Košice Region
- District: Michalovce District
- First mentioned: 1249

Government
  - Mayor: Ing.Marián Makeľ

Area
  - Total: 29.78 km^{2} (11.50 sq mi)
- Elevation: 144 m (472 ft)

Population (2025)
  - Total: 2,204
- Time zone: UTC+1 (CET)
  - Summer (DST): UTC+2 (CEST)
- Postal code: 723 1
- Area code: +421 56
- Vehicle registration plate (until 2022): MI
- Website: www.vinne.sk

Vinné (Hungarian: Vinna) is a village and municipality in Michalovce District in the Kosice Region of eastern Slovakia.

The village is named after the Viniansky Castle which sits on a hill next to the village.

== History ==
In historical records the village was first mentioned in 1249.

== Geography ==
The municipality lies at an altitude of 144 metres (472 ft) and covers an area of 29.78 km^{2} (11.50 sq mi) (2025).

== Population ==
Population statistic (10 years)
Year	1995	2005	2015	2025
Count	1555	1654	1738	2204
Difference		+6.36%	+5.07%	+26.81%

Population statistic
Year	2024	2025
Count	2169	2204
Difference		+1.61%

It has a population of 2204 people (2025-12-31).

== Ethnicity ==
The village is 99% Slovak.

== Facilities ==
The village has a public library, a swimming pool, gymnasium and a football pitch. The village has a hotel, guesthouse and a commercial bank.

== Gallery ==
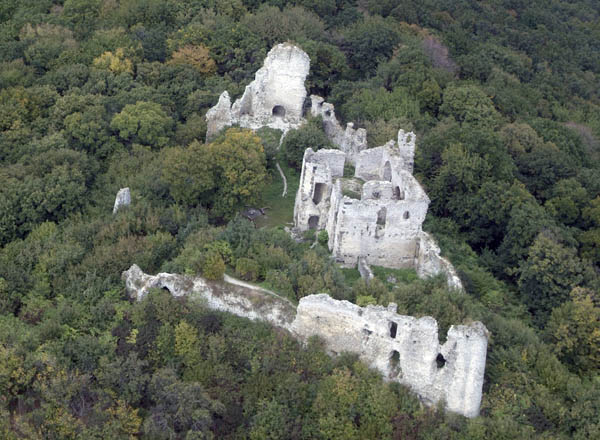
Aerial photography of the castle

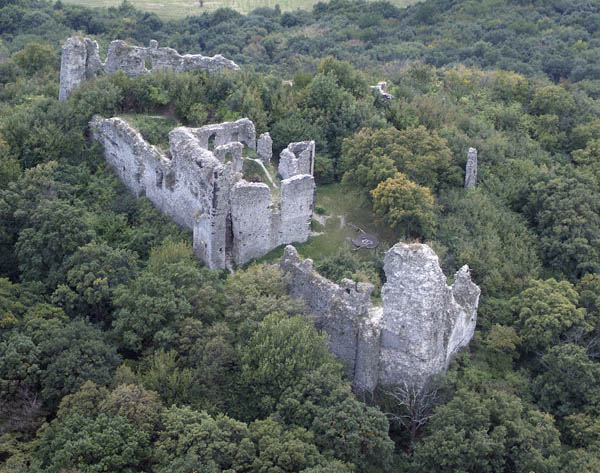

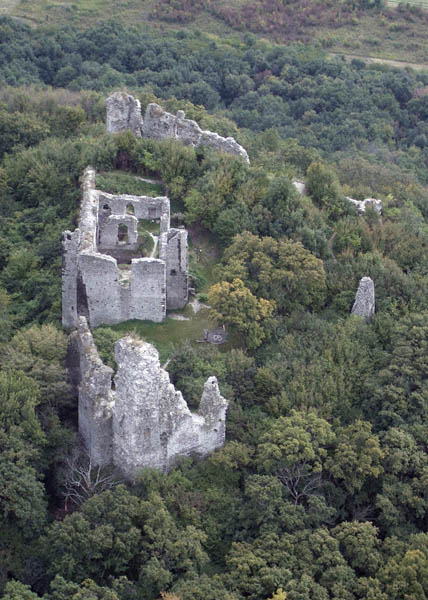
