= Csongrád-Csanád County 3rd constituency =

Constituency in Hungary (2012-)

Csongrád-Csanád County 3rd constituency (Szentes)
- Constituency for the National Assembly
- Location of Csongrád-Csanád county 03 within Csongrád-Csanád county

- Location of Csongrád-Csanád county within Hungary
- County: Csongrád-Csanád
- Electorate: 80,170 (2022)
- Major settlements: Szentes

Current constituency
- Created: 2011
- Party: Tisza Party
- Member: Bence Bárkányi
- Elected: 2026

The 3rd constituency of Csongrád-Csanád County (Hungarian: Csongrád-Csanád megyei 03. számú országgyűlési egyéni választókerület) is one of the single member constituencies of the National Assembly, the national legislature of Hungary. The constituency standard abbreviation: Csongrád-Csanád 03. OEVK.

Since 2026, it has been represented by Bence Bárkányi of the Tisza Party.

== Geography ==
The 3rd constituency is located in northern part of Csongrád-Csanád County.

=== List of municipalities ===
The constituency includes the following municipalities:

1. Árpádhalom
2. Baks
3. Balástya
4. Csanytelek
5. Csengele
6. Csongrád
7. Derekegyház
8. Dóc
9. Eperjes
10. Fábiánsebestyén
11. Felgyő
12. Kistelek
13. Mindszent
14. Nagymágocs
15. Nagytőke
16. Ópusztaszer
17. Pusztaszer
18. Sándorfalva
19. Szatymaz
20. Szegvár
21. Szentes
22. Tömörkény

== Members ==
The constituency was first represented by Sándor Farkas of the Fidesz from 2014, and he was re-elected in 2018 and 2022. In the 2026 election, Bence Bárkányi of the Tisza Party was elected representative.

Election	Member	Party	%	Ref.
2014	Sándor Farkas	Fidesz	45.80	
2018	Sándor Farkas	Fidesz	49.63	
2022	Sándor Farkas	Fidesz	54.74	
2026	Bence Bárkányi	Tisza Party	50.87	
