= List of palaces and mansions in Csongrád County =

This is a list of palaces and mansions in Csongrád County in Hungary.

== List of palaces and mansions in Csongrád County ==
Name	Location	Established	Architect	Style	Family	Picture	Present function
Károlyi–Berchtold Mansion	Árpádhalom	1897-1898		Classicism; Eclecticism	Károly; Berchtold		School; Library; House of culture
Károlyi-Weiss Manison	Derekegyház	1865-1869		Baroque / Zopf	Károlyi; Weiss		Social home
Gerliczy Mansion	Deszk						
Rónay Mansion	Kiszombor	1858		Romanticism	Rónay		Empty
Károlyi Palace	Nagymágocs	1896-1897	Viktor Siedek	Eclecticism; Neobaroque	Károlyi		Social home
Návay Mansion	Óföldeák						
Pallavicini Palace	Ópusztaszer	19th century		Historicism	Pallavicini		Psychiatric institute
Pallavicini Mansion	Sándorfalva						
Károlyi Mansion	Szegvár						

== See also ==
- List of palaces and mansions in Hungary
- List of castles in Hungary

== Literature ==
- Zsolt Virág : Magyar kastélylexikon 3. Csongrád megye kastélyai és kúriái (Castellum Novum, 2002, ISBN 9789632027968)
