= Károlyi Castle (Nagymágocs) =

Castle in Csongrád County, Hungary

- Károlyi-kastély
- Nagymágocs, Szentes District, Csongrád County, Hungary
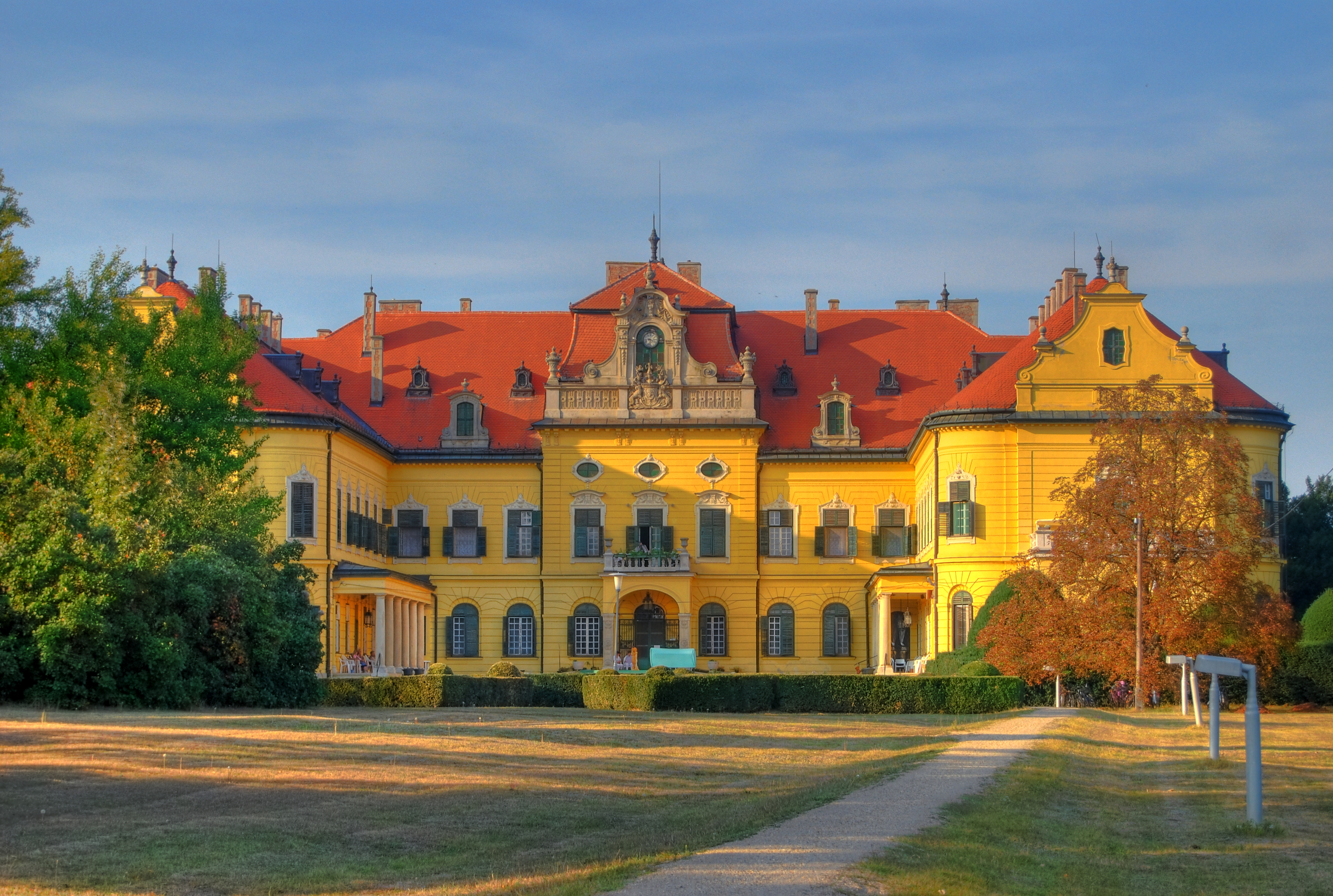
- The Castle, September 2009

Site information
- Type: Castle
- Owner: Government of Hungary
- Open to the public: Yes

Location
- Location of Károlyi Castle in Hungary
- Coordinates: 46°35′16″N 20°28′14″E

Site history
- Built: 1896–1897
- Built for: Károlyi family
- Architect: Viktor Siedek, Miklós Ybl

Károlyi Castle is a 19th-century eclectic and neo-baroque castle located in Nagymágocs, Szentes District, Csongrád County, Hungary. The castle was built by Imre Károlyi, a member of the Károlyi family. The castle was designed by Viktor Siedek, and some of the associated buildings by Miklós Ybl. All the buildings have remained in their original state, although additions have been made to the castle over time and some parts have been demolished. The castle is surrounded by a 41-hectare park decorated with Baroque sculptures from the 18th century and a 10-hectare lake. It also features a single-tower, neo-Romanesque Roman Catholic church built in 1883. Today, Károlyi Castle operates as a social home.

== History ==
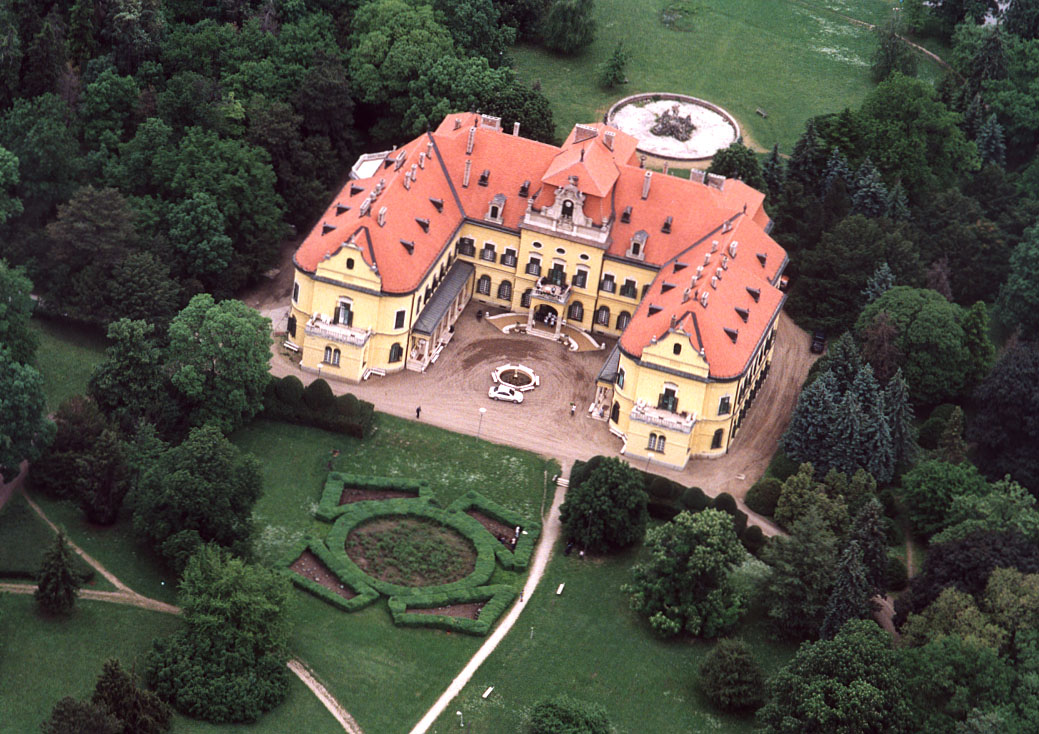
Aerial view of the castle

=== 16th century ===
The area of Nagymágocs was the estate of the Mágochy family, which originated from the area and later played a national role, in the second half of the 16th century. After the death of Captain Mágochy, the chief Lord of Heves, Külső-Szolnok, Bereg and Torna counties, his nephew, András Mágóchy I, and then his sons, Gáspár Mágóchy II and Ferenc Mágóchy II, inherited the estate. Ferenc Mágochy II was the chief Lord of Torna and Bereg counties, and also held the position of Captain-General of Upper Hungary. Nagymágocs was completely destroyed by Tatar troops during the conquest in 1596. Nagymágocs then became a wasteland, and with the death of Ferenc Mágochy II, the family, which became extinct in the male line, passed to the family of Dorottya Mágochy's husband, the Móricz family of Medgyesegyháza.

=== 17th century ===
At the beginning of the 17th century, the area belonged to Zsigmond Móricz, from whom Prince Gábor Bethlen confiscated his estates in 1621 for disloyalty. In 1640, the son-in-law of Máron Móricz, Miklós Keglević, the captain of Ónod Castle, who had died in the meantime, received back Mágocspuszta, which he then leased to the people of Vásárhely. The village was resettled twice until the end of the Turkish occupation, because first Hungarian residents moved here, but then they had to flee around 1625. After the Hungarians, in 1677, a few Serbian families settled in the area. The Serbs did not live in Mágocs for long either, because in 1687 the retreating Turkish troops burned the village. After the occupation, the Keglević Counts ruled over the area. However, the New Acquisitions Committee did not confirm the ownership rights of the Keglevich Counts, and King Leopold I donated Mágocspuszta to Leopold Schlick in 1702 as part of the Csongrád and Vásárhely manors.

=== 18th century ===
In 1722, the Károlyi family received the area from the Schlick family. The Károlyi family developed an extensive estate system in the Great Plain at this time, and the count purchased additional estates in addition to the Csongrád and Vásárhely estates: in the counties of Csongrád, Csanád and Békés. The Károlyi family soon took over the Mágocs area, which had been rented by the residents of Vásárhely until then, under domestic management. In 1748, the plain served exclusively for manorial farming purposes, the administrator of which was Ignác Szendrey (the father of Júlia Szendrey). After the death of Count Sándor Károlyi in 1743, his only living son, Ferenc Károlyi, became the owner of the vast estates. According to the 1771 landlord survey, the people of Vásárhely were once again renting a significant part of the Károlyi estate for public grazing purposes, which was then the property of Count Ferenc's son, General Antal Károlyi. After Count Antal's death in 1791, his son József Károlyi inherited the Csongrád and Vásárhely estates, and after his death in 1803, the property passed to his minor children, István, Lajos and György. When the brothers were declared of age in 1827, the family estates that had been managed jointly until then were also divided among themselves. The Mágocs part of the Csongrád and Vásárhely estates, which was called Külső-Derekegyháza, became the property of Count Lajos. Belső-Derekegyháza (today's Derekegyház) and the Castle there became the property of István Károlyi. It is not known exactly when the first castle of the Károlyi counts in Mágocs was built, however, the first mention of the castle was during the ownership of Lajos, in the description of Palugyay in 1855. The "Four Seasons" sculpture group in the park, dating from 1771 according to the date of its pedestal, has a secondary location. The description also mentions the extensive game garden belonging to the residence. The old mansion, now demolished, stood between the current mansion and the lakeside house.

=== 19th century ===
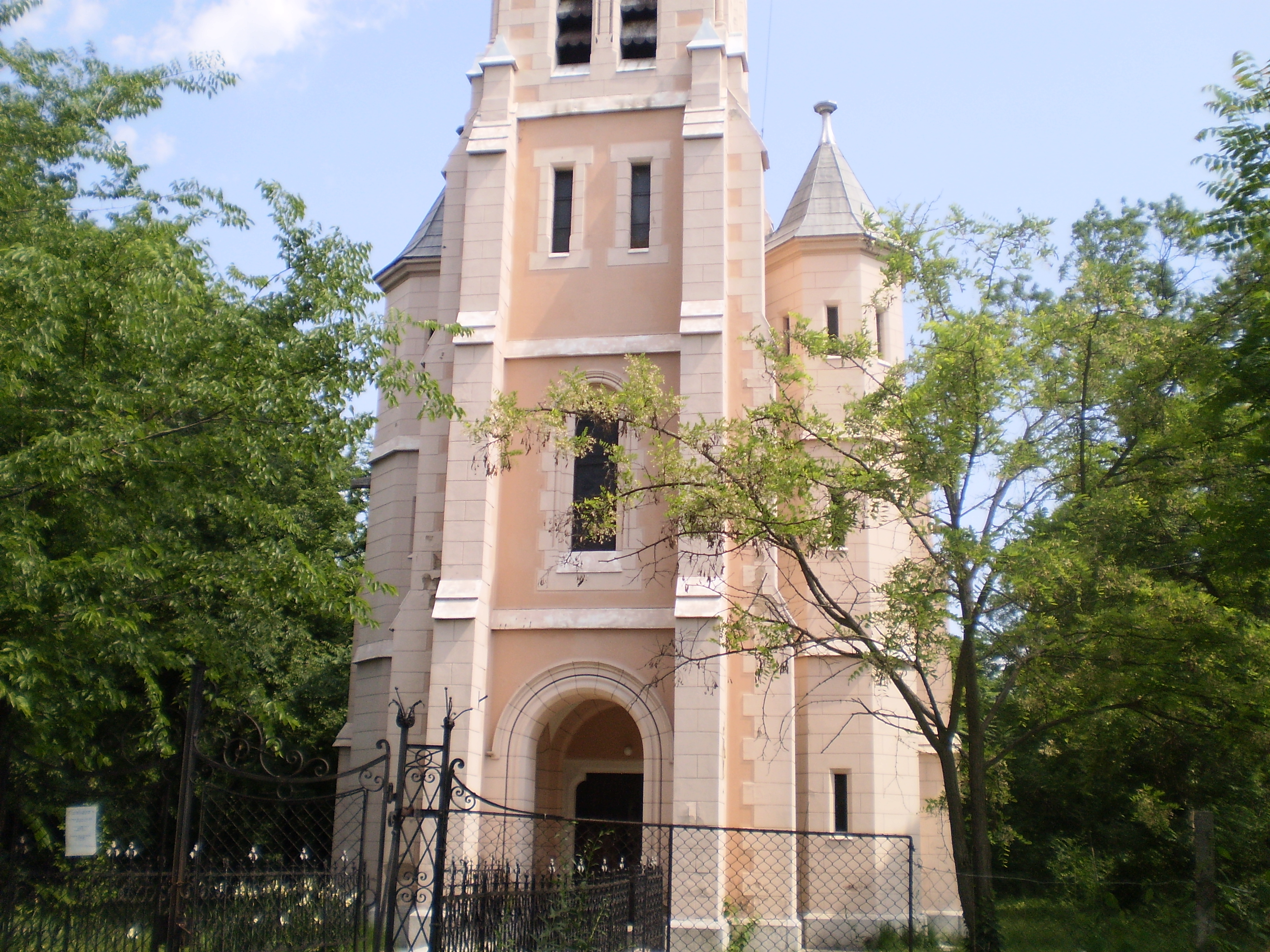
The entrance to the neo-Romanesque style Roman Catholic church.

In the mid-19th century it was called Mágocs and was the center of the estates of Count Lajos in the Great Plain. The village had 20 manorial farm buildings, several of which were designed by Miklós Ybl, such as the manorial offices (now the village hall) in 1848 and 1849, the auditor's house (now the parish) in 1853, and the Great Granary in 1856. (The façade drawing and floor plan of the Great Granary were also published in the book about the Mágocs manor published in 1860). In the 1850s, the manor here already included several acres of land: Árpádhalom, Lajosszállás, Louistown, Laszlotelek, Tompahát, and Zoltántérmajor.

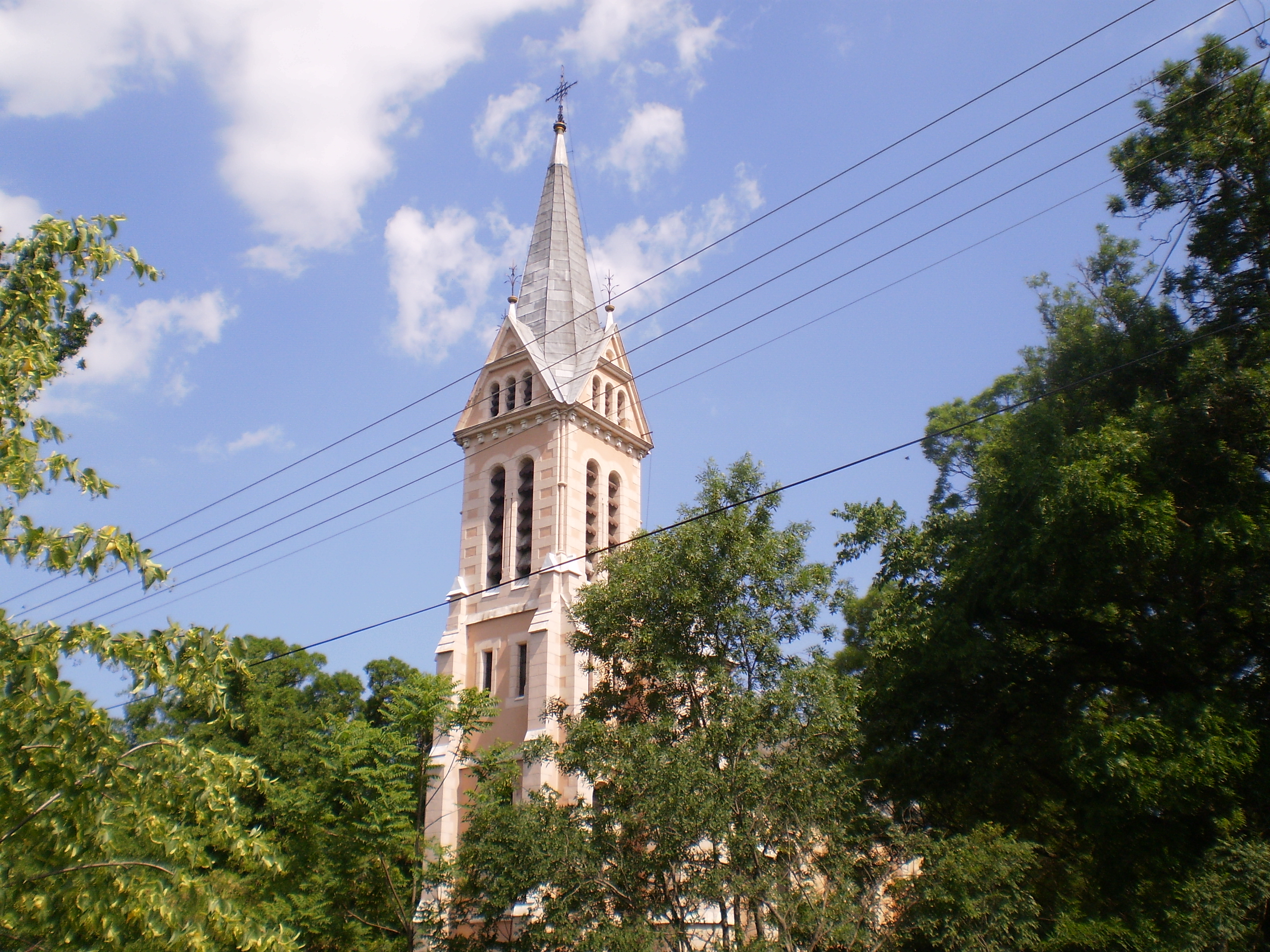
The tower of the neo-Romanesque style Roman Catholic church

The development of the Mágocs estate into a model farm is linked to the name of the estate governor Imre Klauzál (the elder brother of the estate governor Gábor Klauzál, the Minister of Industry and Trade in the Batthyány government), who was considered one of the most outstanding economic experts of the 19th century. When Imre Klauzál took over the management of the estates of Count Kázmér Batthyány of Németújvár in 1838, his successor was Ignác Szendrey, who further developed the management of the estate, as a result of which the Mágocs estate became a nationally renowned model farm by the 1850s. The daughter of the excellent estate governor was Júlia Szendrey, who was the wife of the famous poet Sándor Petőfi. After the defeat of the War of Independence, Szendrey's grandson, Zoltán Petőfi, was raised here for a year. The Count's family continued to rely on the advice of the former estate governor even after Szendrey retired in 1853, who from time to time toured the estates of Count Lajos and provided guidance on the further development of the estates. After the death of Lajos Károlyi in 1863, his son, Count Alajos Károlyi, inherited the Mágocs estate. In 1871, the landowner founded schools in the more populous farms of the estate for the children of the servants.

In 1883, Count Alajos had a new, neo-Romanesque Roman Catholic church built in honor of Saint Aloysius Gonzaga in Nagymágocs. After Alajos's death in 1889, his daughter, Countess Zsófia "Sophie" Károlyi, inherited the greater part of the Mágocs estate and the residence, his second daughter, Countess Ferdinanda "Nandine", received the estates of Árpádhalom, Zoltántér and Szentreymajor, while his son, Lajos, received the estates and castles of Tótmegyer in Pozsony County, Stomfa and Nyitra County. In 1896, Countess Zsófia Károlyi married her second cousin, Count György Károlyi's grandson, Imre Károlyi. Shortly after the wedding, in 1896 and 1897, the couple had a new castle built in Nagymágocs, containing predominantly neo-baroque elements. The original plans and documentation of the building are missing, but according to the Austrian Architekten Lexikon, it was designed by the Viennese architect Viktor Siedek, who worked for numerous famous clients in nearby Csorvás, Póstelek, Kistapolcsány, Budapest and throughout the former Greater Hungary where he designed palaces, churches and villas alike.

=== 20th century ===
After the castle was built, the interior design work was delayed, the wooden upper part of the fireplace in the library room, made by the Budapest cabinetmaker László Damjanovics, was completed in April 1902, and the wall fountains and taps of the residence were made by Károly Knuth.

In 1910, the Count family had the first floor of the castle converted into a chapel, in a unique way in Hungarian practice, because their firstborn son, Tibor Károlyi, who died at the age of 8, was buried there, and they wanted to preserve his memory in this way. The floor and walls of the chapel are covered with white and black marble slabs, the ceiling is decorated with stucco, and in the middle there is a white marble altar with a staircase. The original furnishings of the chapel included two armchairs, and on the right wall there are life-size statues of Count Tibor Károlyi and Count Imréné Károlyi, made of Carrara marble. During the construction of the chapel, the Károlyis contacted the bishopric about making the chapel public, which was later approved by Pope Pius V.

Several statues and groups of statues were placed in the castle park. The largest of the statues is the "Abduction of the Sabine Women" fountain, the original of which can be seen in Paris. The "Little Boy with Fish" fountain was placed in the courtyard, and the "Four Seasons" sculpture group is also located in this part of the park, dated 1771. Imre Károlyi's daughter, Consuelo Károlyi, was married to Miklós Horthy Jr., with whom she had two children. Imre Károlyi's favorite flower was the lilac, and the family always came down from Pest to Nagymágocs when the lilacs were in bloom. Imre Károlyi also enjoyed gardening, and he pruned the trees in the park himself. The count also established a dairy company in the village. After World War I, Károlyi distributed land to the widows of soldiers who had fallen in battle, and he provided "heroic plots" to soldiers returning home. The castle staff during Imre Károlyi's ownership consisted of twelve people. In 1910, the Károlyis built a new family tomb under the sanctuary of the Nagymágocs church, which also coincided with the death of Count Tibor Károlyi. Count Imre died in 1943, at which time his coffin, together with the remains of the family members who were buried in the crypt in Nagymágocs, was transported to the ancient estate in Nagymágocs, Szatmár County, which was annexed to Hungary by the Second Vienna Decision. After the death of the landowner, his third son, Viktor Károlyi, took over the management of the Mágocs estate for a short time.

=== Post World War II ===
At the end of World War II, the Count's family fled, most of the furnishings of the abandoned castle were taken away, and the rare books were burned in the fireplace. In the summer of 1944, as the front approached, the Hungarian Royal 113th Field Hospital was located in the castle. In 1945, the state confiscated the remaining furniture, paintings, and other artifacts, and thento Szentes, to Sárospatak, and then transported to Eger.

After the nationalization, the castle was first used as a holiday resort for the Csepel Iron and Steel Works, then as a lodging for Greek freedom fighters. Later, the Social Home of the Csongrád County Council was located in the building, which had 150 beds. Today, the Castle Home (social home) of the Csongrád-Csanád County Assembly operates within the castle.

== Gallery ==
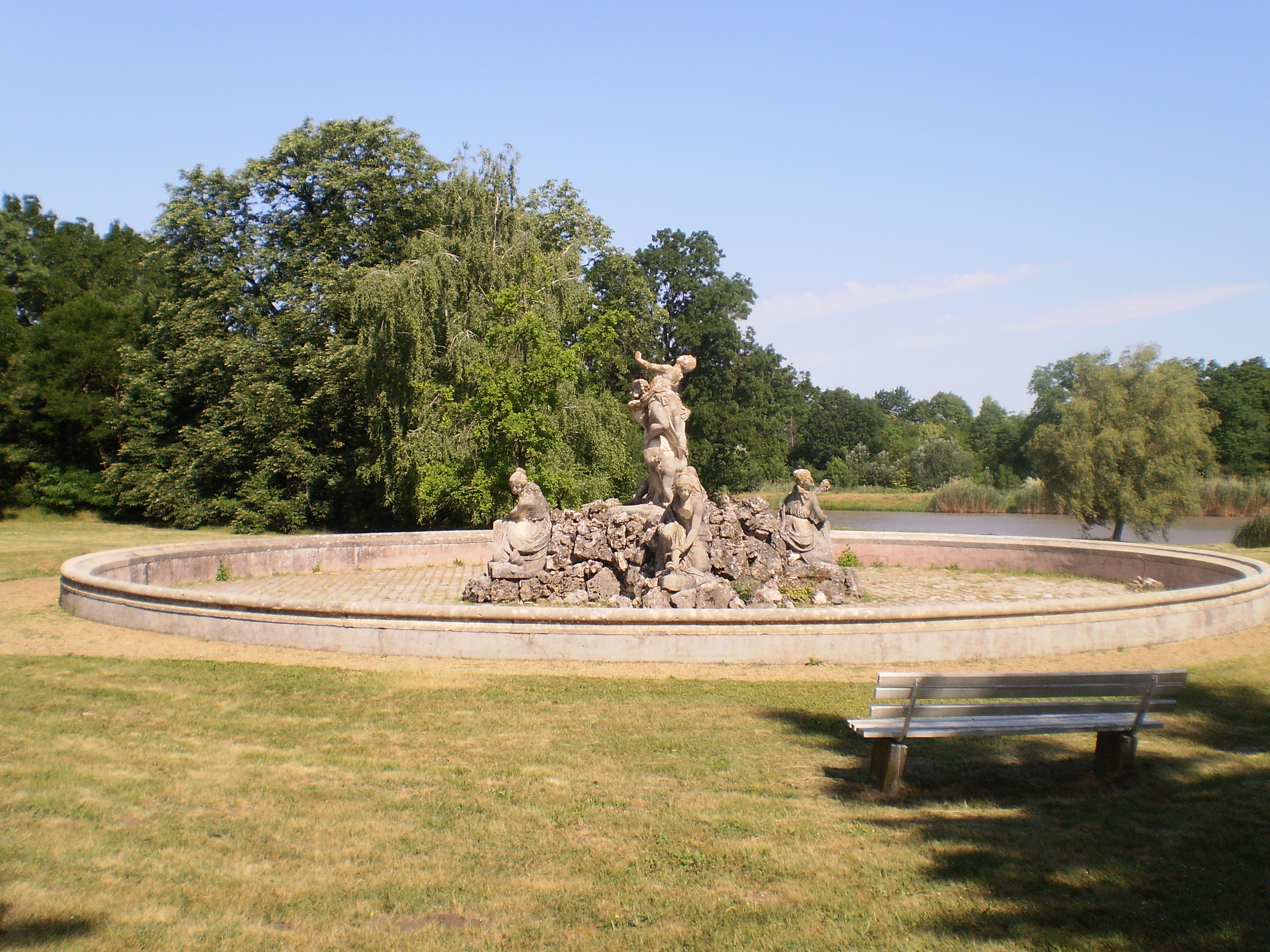
"Abduction of the Sabine Women" fountain. The fountain is no longer in operation.

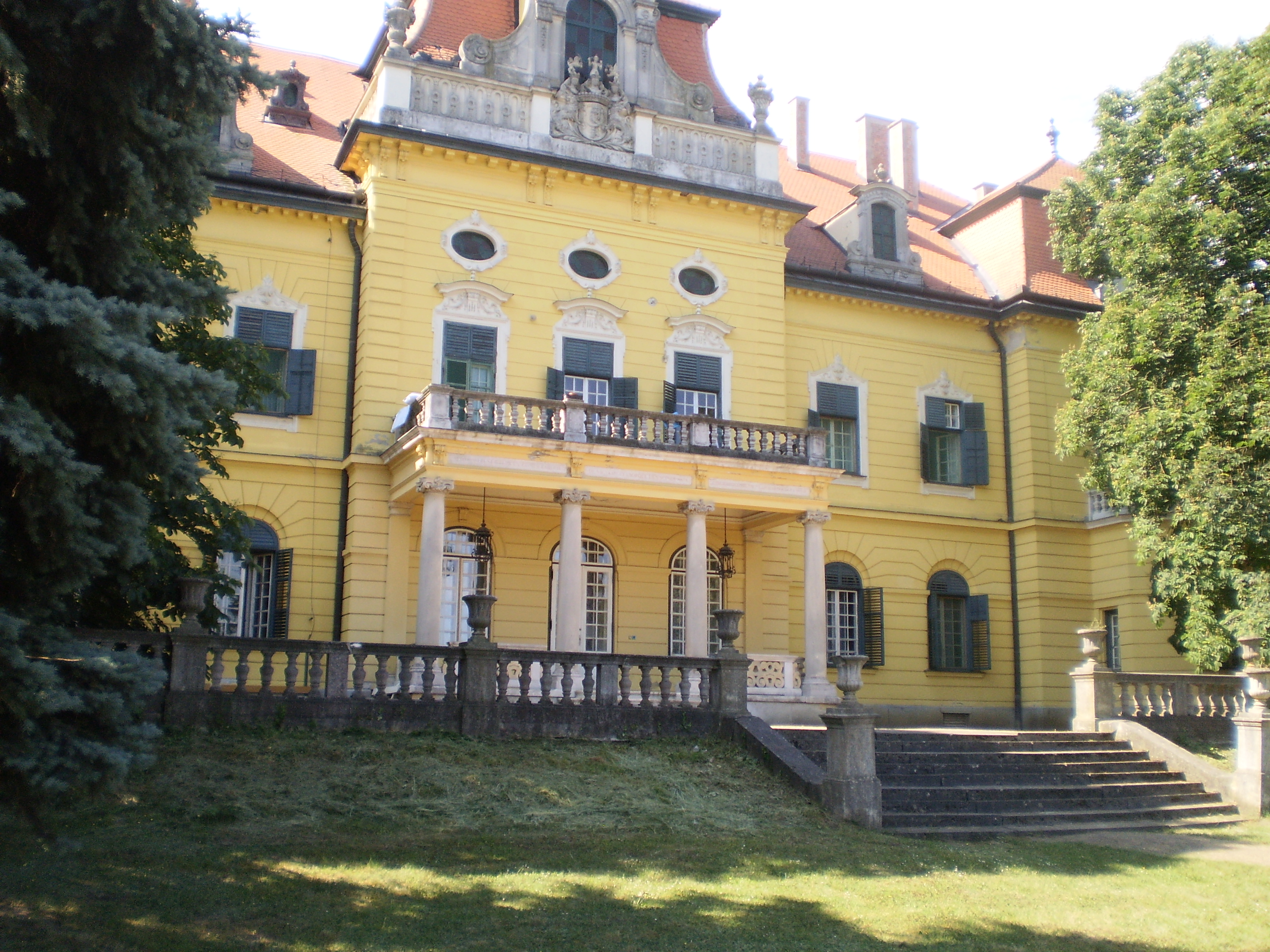
Part of the castle

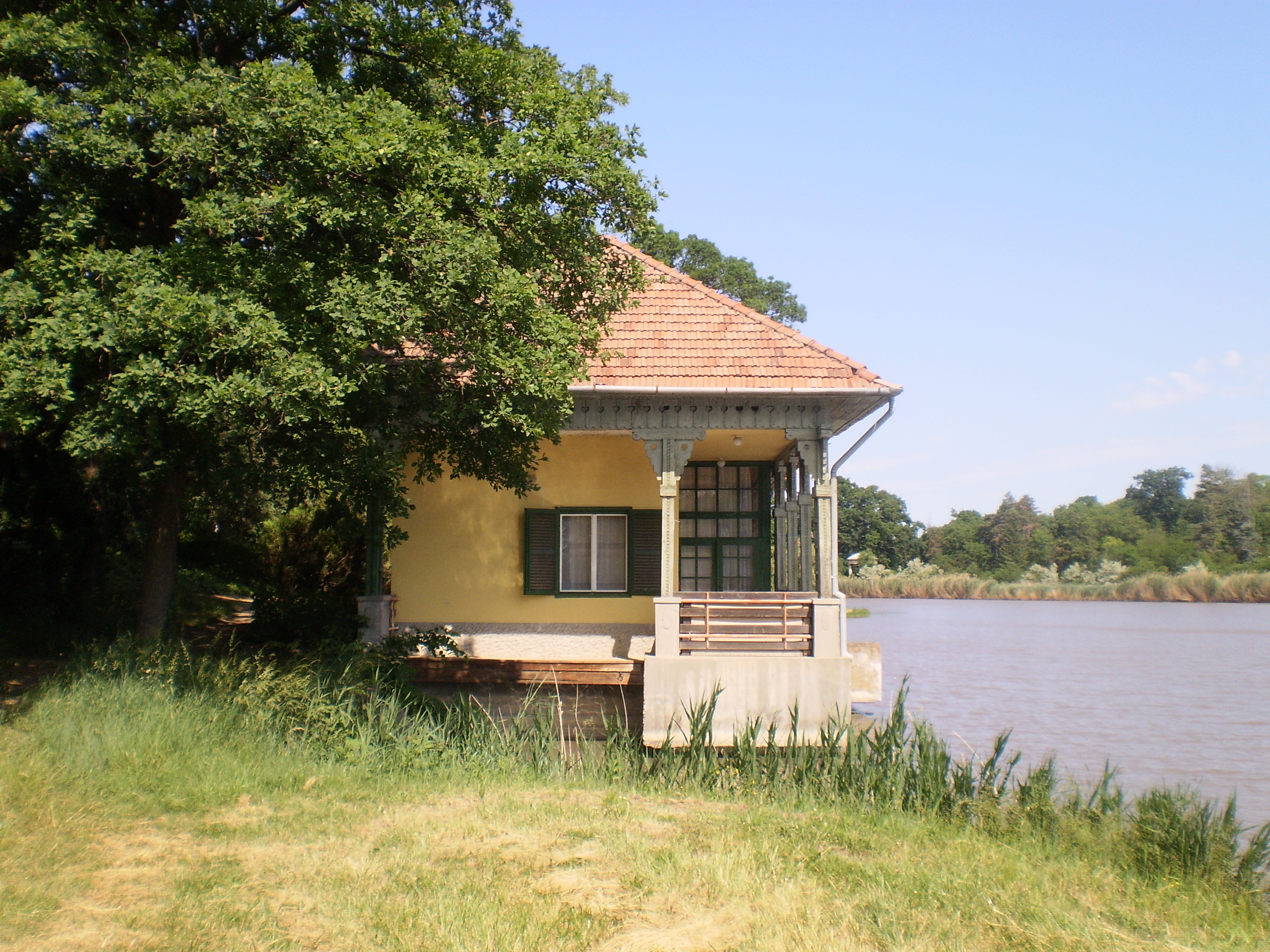
The boathouse and part of the fish pond.

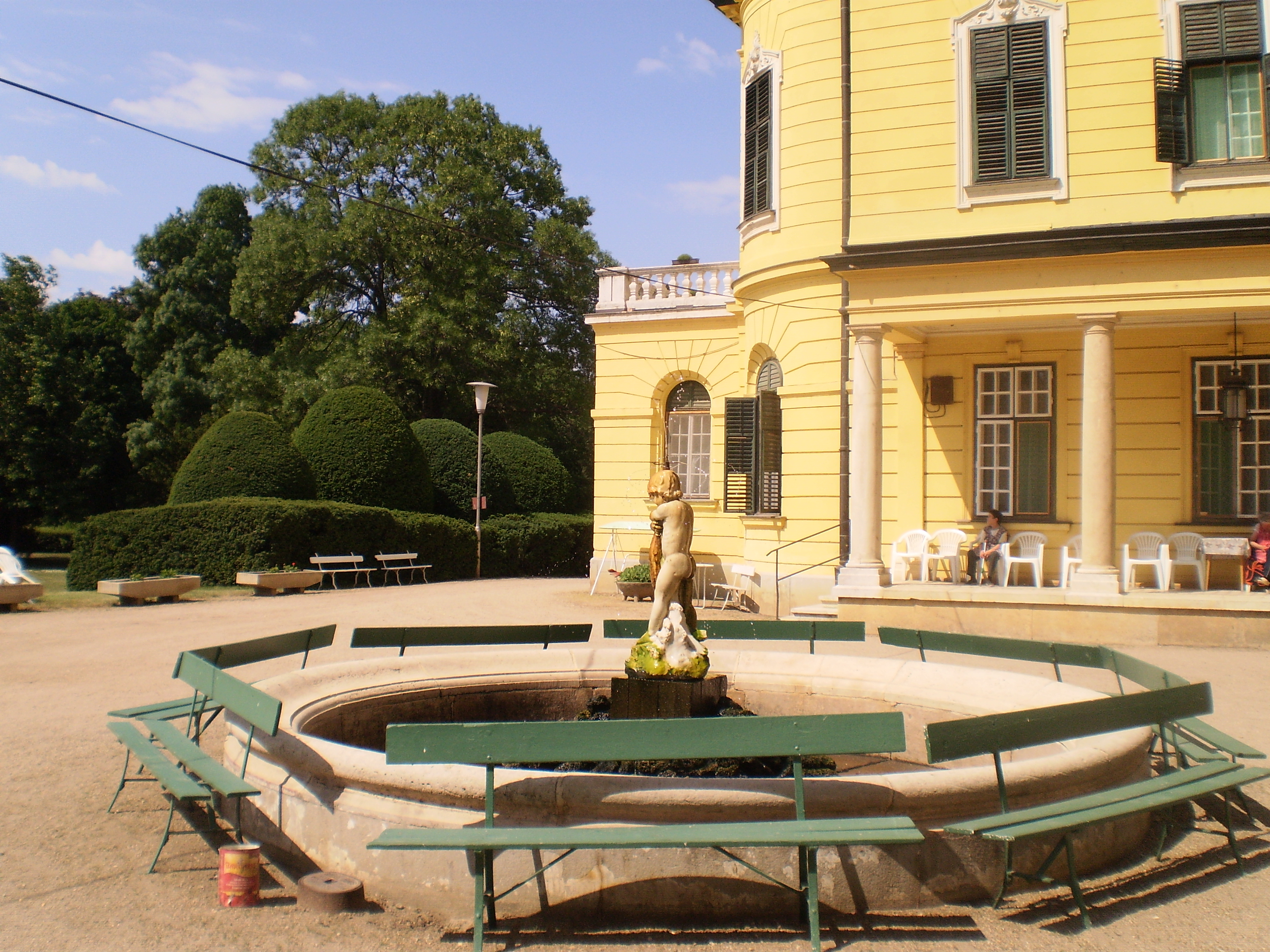
The "Little Boy with Fish" Fountain

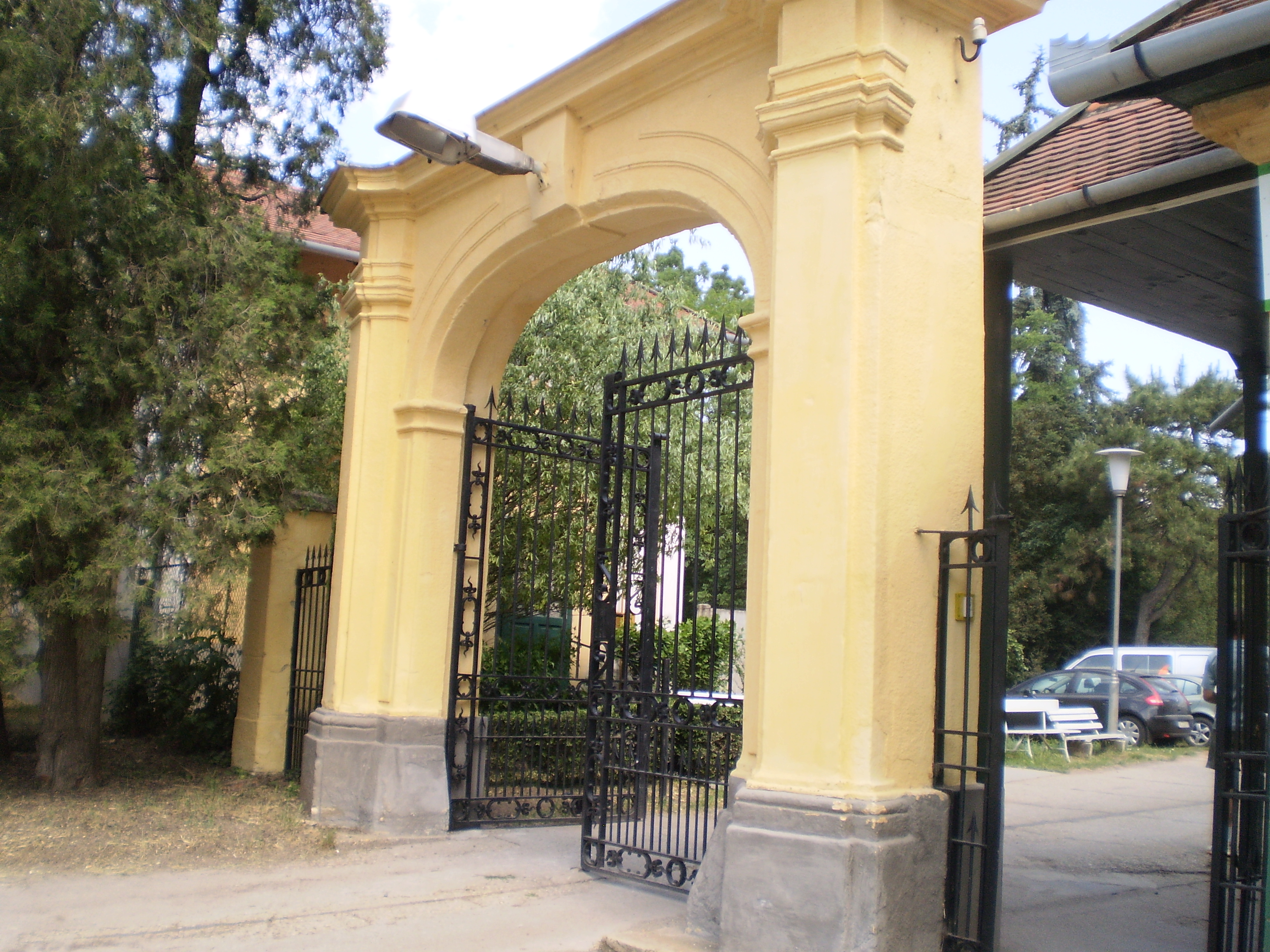
The castle gate.
