= Kistelek =

- Town
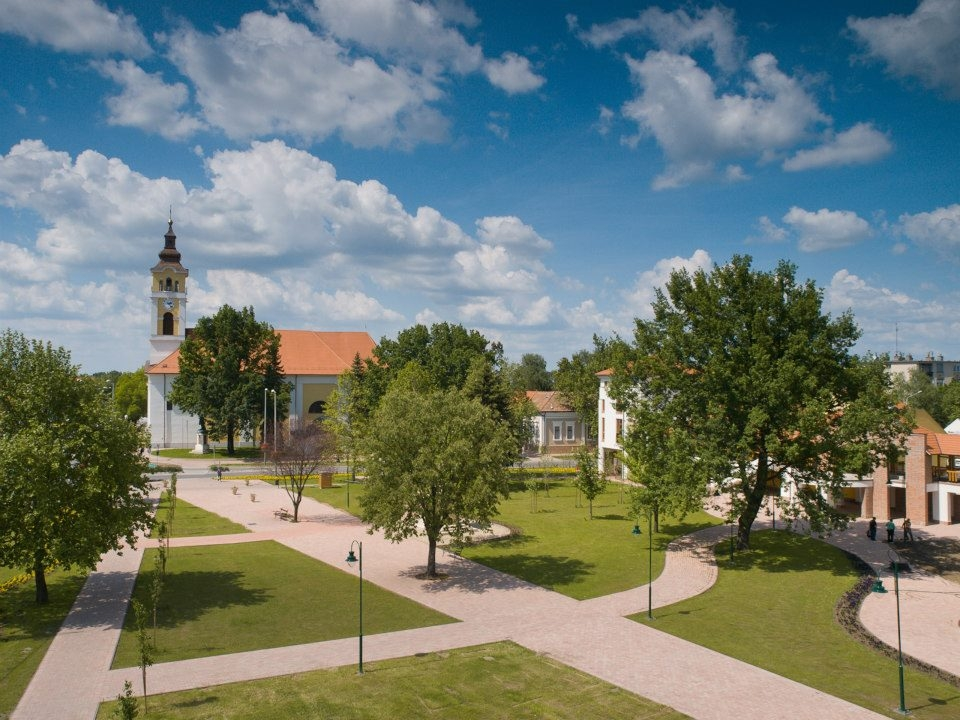
- Aerial view

- Flag Coat of arms

- Location within Hungary
- Coordinates: 46.473°N 19.980°E
- Country: Hungary
- County: Csongrád
- District: Kistelek

Area
  - Total: 69.19 km^{2} (26.71 sq mi)

Population (2023)
  - Total: 7,039
  - Density: 101.7/km^{2} (263.5/sq mi)
- Time zone: UTC+1 (CET)
  - Summer (DST): UTC+2 (CEST)
- Postal code: 6760
- Area code: (+36) 62
- Website: www.kistelek.hu

Kistelek is a town in Csongrad-Csanád county, in the Southern Great Plain region of southern Hungary.

== Geography ==
It covers an area of 69.19 km^{2} (26.71 sq mi) and has a population of 7020 people (2012).

== History ==
In the early Middle Ages, the town was a Cuman settlement that had a church. The town first appeared in writing in 1420. Following the Ottoman occupation of Hungary, the settlement went extinct, and became pastureland belonging to Szeged.

The town started to reform in 1747 when a post office, feasting hall (a "Csárda"), and seven small homes popped up along the road to Kiskunfélegyháza.

The more significant reconstruction of the town had an unusual motivation. The road connecting Budapest with Szeged carried large amounts of post, and couriers often fell prey to bandits in the pasturelands around Kistelek. The government tried to alleviate this problem by asking Szeged to sell these pasturelands, and send settlers. The local government in Szeged eventually managed to find 100 families, mostly from the region of Mátra, to settle the town. The sandy pasturelands were turned into vineyards, which were unfortunately destroyed by an epidemic of phylloxera in the 1860s and 70s.

In 1989 Kistelek was granted town status. Today, the town functions as the economic, educational, medical, and administrative centre for the surrounding villages of Baks, Balástya, Csengele, Ópusztaszer, and Pusztaszer.

== Demographics ==
In 2023, the town's total population was 7039. As of the 2022 national census the town was 90.5% Hungarian, 0.9% Gypsy, and 2.5% of non-European origin. The population was 36.3% Roman Catholic, and 2.4% Reformed.

== Twin towns – sister cities ==
Kistelek is twinned with:

- Gerace, Italy
- Poręba, Poland
