= Károlyi Castle (Derekegyház) =

19th-century castle in Derekegyház, Csongrád County, Hungary

- Károlyi-Weiss-kastély
- Derekegyház, Csongrád County, Hungary
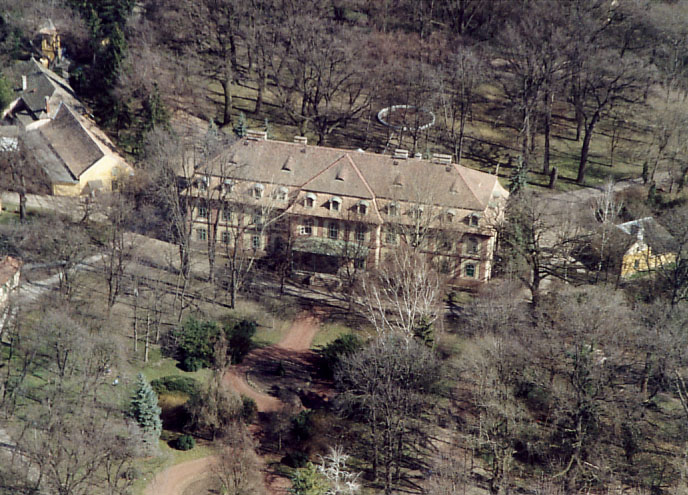

Site information
- Type: Castle

Location
- Location of Károlyi Castle in Hungary
- Coordinates: 46°34′52.8″N 20°21′31.02″E

Site history
- Built: 1765–1769, 1932
- Built for: Károlyi family

Károlyi-Weiss Castle is a 19th-century castle located in Derekegyház, Csongrád County, Hungary. The castle was built in the Baroque and Copf Style for the Károlyi family.

== History ==
The Csongrád-Vásárhely manor was in the possession of Mátyás Szuhay and Gáspár Szuhay in the 17th century, but the Emperor confiscated it from them for disloyalty, and, in 1670, the chamber managed the treasury lands. Part of the manor was purchased by Count Lipót Schlick in 1702. In addition to Derekegyház-puszta, this also included Csongrád, Vásárhely and Szegvár. In 1722, the Count sold the estate of about 118,000 cadastral acres to Sándor Károlyi for 30,000 forints.

=== Károlyi ownership ===
Count Sándor Károlyi established the center of his Great Plain estates in Szegvár. After his death in 1743, his son, Ferenc Károlyi, transferred the Szegvár Castle to his sister, Klára Károlyi (and her husband, Gábor Haller) and established the new estate center in Derekegyházpuszta with a manor house and farm buildings. The Baroque-Copf style castle at Derekegyház was built by his son, Count Antal Károlyi, between 1765 and 1769 next to the previous manor buildings, and it was at this time that the development of the castle park began. After his death in 1791, his only son, Count József Károlyi, inherited the castle, who had the large kitchen in the courtyard converted into a chapel in 1799. A picture of St. John of Nepomuk was placed above the altar; in addition, pictures of St. Wendel, St. Joseph and the Virgin Mary were placed in the room. It had no tower, only a bell tower was built near it, which can still be found today, built into the stone fence. Count József Károlyi died young, at the age of 34, and his estates were inherited by his three minor sons. At the time of Count József's death in 1803, an inventory of the Castle showed it to be a one-story building, mostly in good condition, made of burnt brick and had a shingle roof. On the ground floor, there were three corridors, nine rooms, one kitchen, and one outhouse. There were also rooms for the farm officers and their dining room, the landlady's room, and other service rooms. The cellar under the dining room could hold 200 akós of wine. A wooden porch ran in front of the ground floor. A three-turn oak staircase led to the upper floor, the spaces between the turns were laid out with white marble. The Count and his family lived on the upper floor, and their suites and the stateroom were located here. The corridors were paved with marble, the double doors were made of oak, the windows had leaded glass panes, and copper fittings. The ceilings of the rooms were decorated with stucco and the walls with wood paneling. The heating was provided by gilded white tiled stoves. Eight summer rooms were created on the third, attic level. A flower garden and orchard stretched on the western side of the building, and the courtyard was located on the eastern side; here stood the chapel, as well as the associated sacristy and oratory.

In 1827, after the three sons came of age, they divided the property among themselves. The castle became the property of the eldest, István Károlyi, who died in 1881. His heirs (his grandson from his eldest son, László, and his younger son, Sándor) shared the 25,000-acre estate, which was reunited in László's hands after Count Sándor's death in 1906. László Károlyi owned several castles and a palace in Pest, so he sold the little-used residence in Derekegyháza in 1914 to the ammunition manufacturer Manfréd Weiss, who had previously purchased a nearly 9,000-acre part of the estate.

=== Weiss ownership ===
Manfréd Weiss was a board member of the National Association of Industrialists, a Member of Parliament and a member of the House of Magnates. In 1896, he was given the title of nobleman with the first name "Csepel", and in September 1918 he was elevated to the rank of Baron by Charles IV. His family spent Christmas and Easter holidays in Derekegyház, but apart from that they only used the castle in the summer and during autumn hunting. After Weiss's death in 1922, his children inherited the 7,619-acre estate. The castle, which had deteriorated under the Károlyi family, was renovated and modernized in 1932; at that time, its roof was replaced with a mansard roof, which was completely built in, and rooms were created in the attic. The Károlyi coat of arms in the tympanum of the main façade was replaced by an oval skylight. The interior layout has not changed, practically reflecting the Baroque state even today.

During World War II, during the German occupation, the Weiss family, of Jewish origin, were allowed to leave the country in exchange for handing over part of their property, including the Derekegyháza estate. The castle was looted shortly afterwards, its furnishings taken away partly by German soldiers and partly by the residents of the area. Later, some of the paintings from here were transferred to the József Koszta Museum in Szentes.

=== Post World War II ===
After the end of World War II, the castle was nationalized, and, in 1949, became a social home for the mentally disabled. Since 2018, a mental social nursing home of the Csongrád County Municipality has been operating here. The castle park, which was 150 cadastral acres in the middle of the 19th century, has now shrunk to 10 hectares, and only a small part of it, around the building, has remained in its original form, the rest is covered in forest. Before the World War, there was a swimming pool and a tennis court in the park. There is a chapel and a belfry on its territory.
