= Kistelek District =

Coordinates: 46.4667°N 19.9833°E

Kistelek District Kisteleki járás
- Districts of Hungary
- Coat of arms

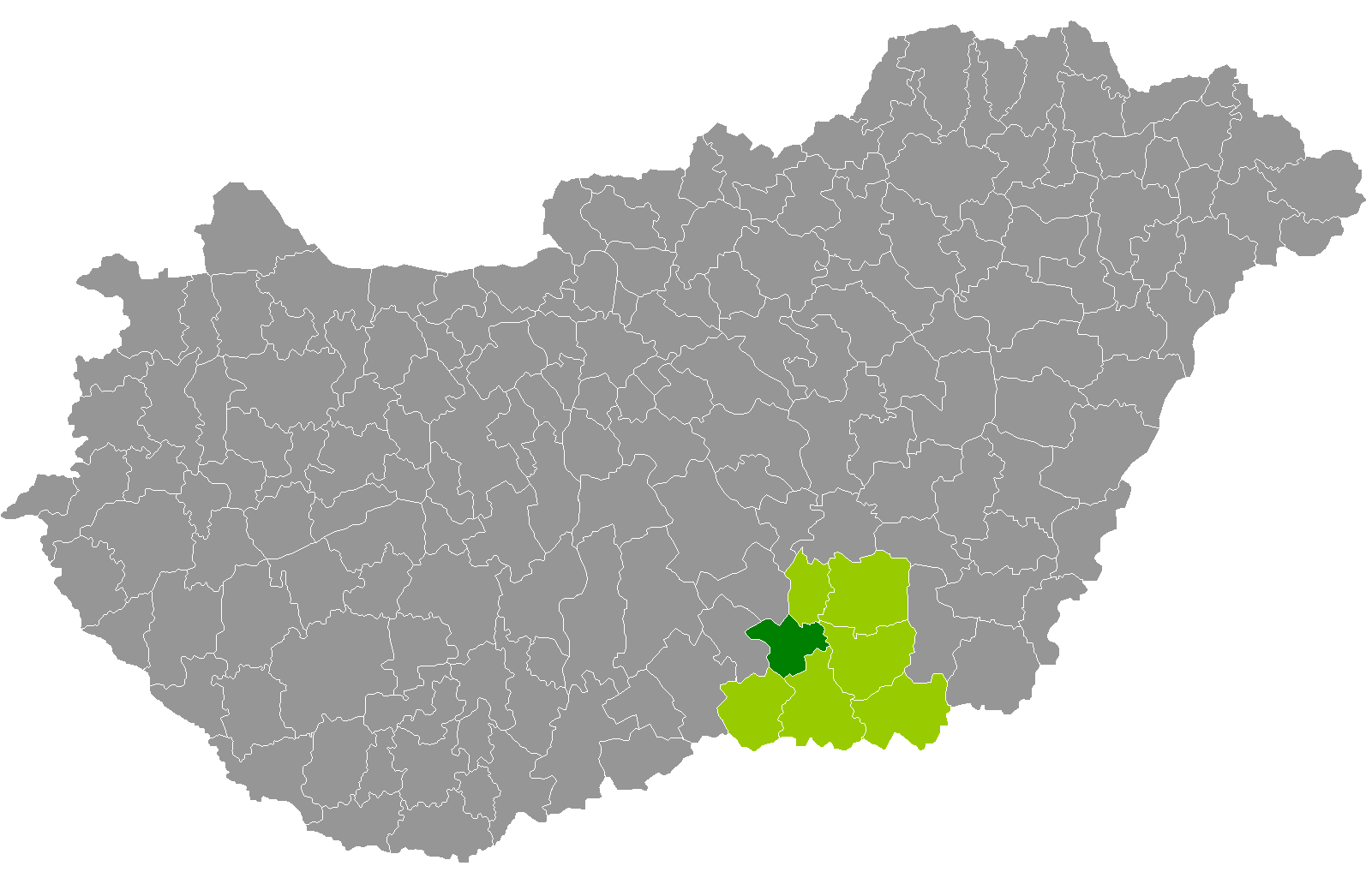
- Kistelek District within Hungary and Csongrád County.
- Country: Hungary
- County: Csongrád
- District seat: Kistelek

Area
  - Total: 410.20 km^{2} (158.38 sq mi)
  - Rank: 6th in Csongrád

Population (2011 census)
  - Total: 18,185
  - Rank: 7th in Csongrád
  - Density: 44/km^{2} (110/sq mi)

Kistelek (Hungarian: Kisteleki járás) is a district in western part of Csongrád County. Kistelek is also the name of the town where the district seat is found. The district is located in the Southern Great Plain Statistical Region.

== Geography ==
Kistelek District borders with Kiskunfélegyháza District (Bács-Kiskun County) and Csongrád District to the north, Hódmezővásárhely District to the east, Szeged District to the southeast, Mórahalom District to the south, Kiskunmajsa District (Bács-Kiskun County) to the west. The number of the inhabited places in Kistelek District is 6.

== Municipalities ==
The district has 1 town and 5 villages. (ordered by population, as of 1 January 2012)

- Baks (1,963)
- Balástya (3,423)
- Csengele (1,967)
- **Kistelek** (7,020) – district seat
- Ópusztaszer (2,299)
- Pusztaszer (1,480)

The bolded municipality is the city.

== Demographics ==
Religion in Kistelek District (2011 census)
1. Catholic Church (61.5%)
2. Greek Catholicism (0.20%)
3. Calvinism (2.50%)
4. Lutheranism (0.30%)
5. Orthodoxy (0.20%)
6. Other religions (0.80%)
7. Non-religious (10.6%)
8. Atheists (0.80%)
9. Undeclared (23.1%)

In 2011, it had a population of 18,185 and the population density was 44/km^{2}.

| Year | County population | Change |
|---|---|---|
| 2011 | 18,185 | n/a |

=== Ethnicity ===
Besides the Hungarian majority, the main minorities are the Roma (approx. 500) and Romanian (200).

Total population (2011 census): 18,185
Ethnic groups (2011 census): Identified themselves: 16,842 persons:

- Hungarians: 15,933 (94.60%)
- Gypsies: 475 (2.82%)
- Romanians: 219 (1.30%)
- Others and indefinable: 215 (1.28%)

Approx. 1,500 persons in Kistelek District did not declare their ethnic group at the 2011 census.

=== Religion ===
Religious adherence in the county according to 2011 census:

- Catholic – 11,215 (Roman Catholic – 11,185; Greek Catholic – 30);
- Reformed – 464;
- Evangelical – 52;
- Orthodox – 31;
- other religions – 153;
- Non-religious – 1,928;
- Atheism – 142;
- Undeclared – 4,200.

== Gallery ==
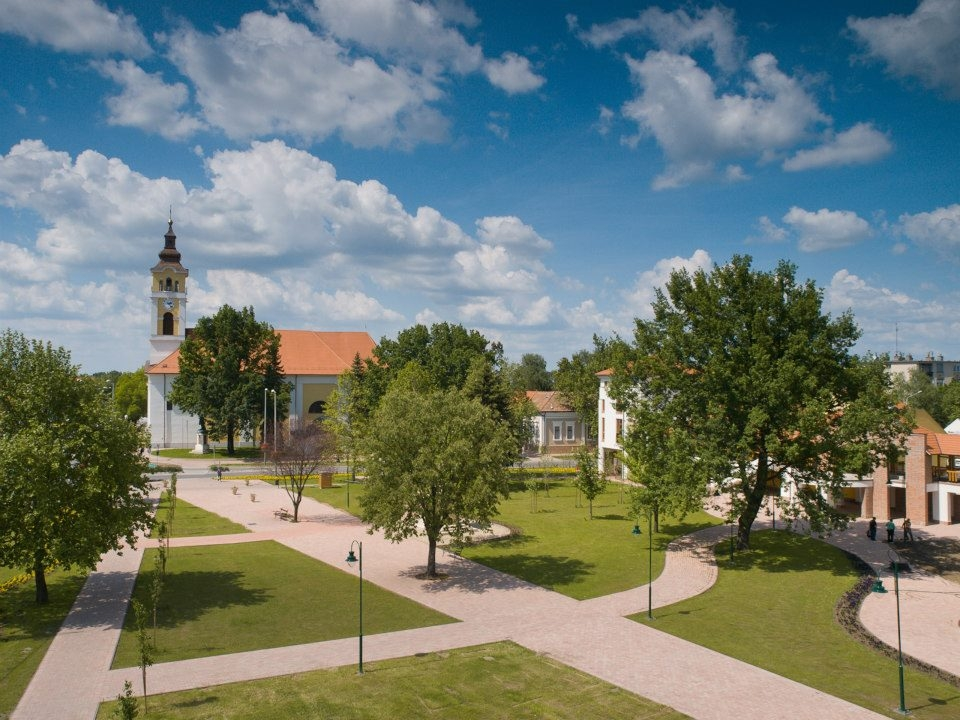
Kistelek, the district seat

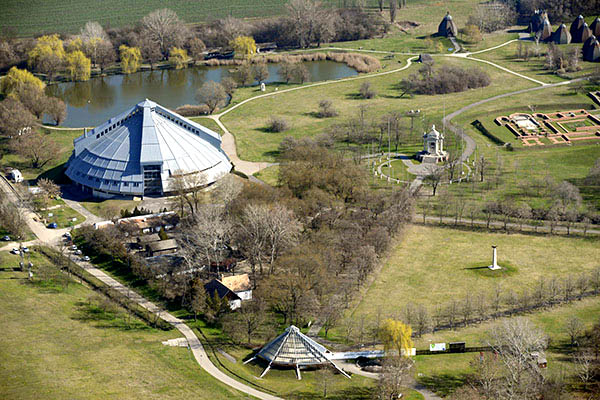
Ópusztaszer National Heritage Park

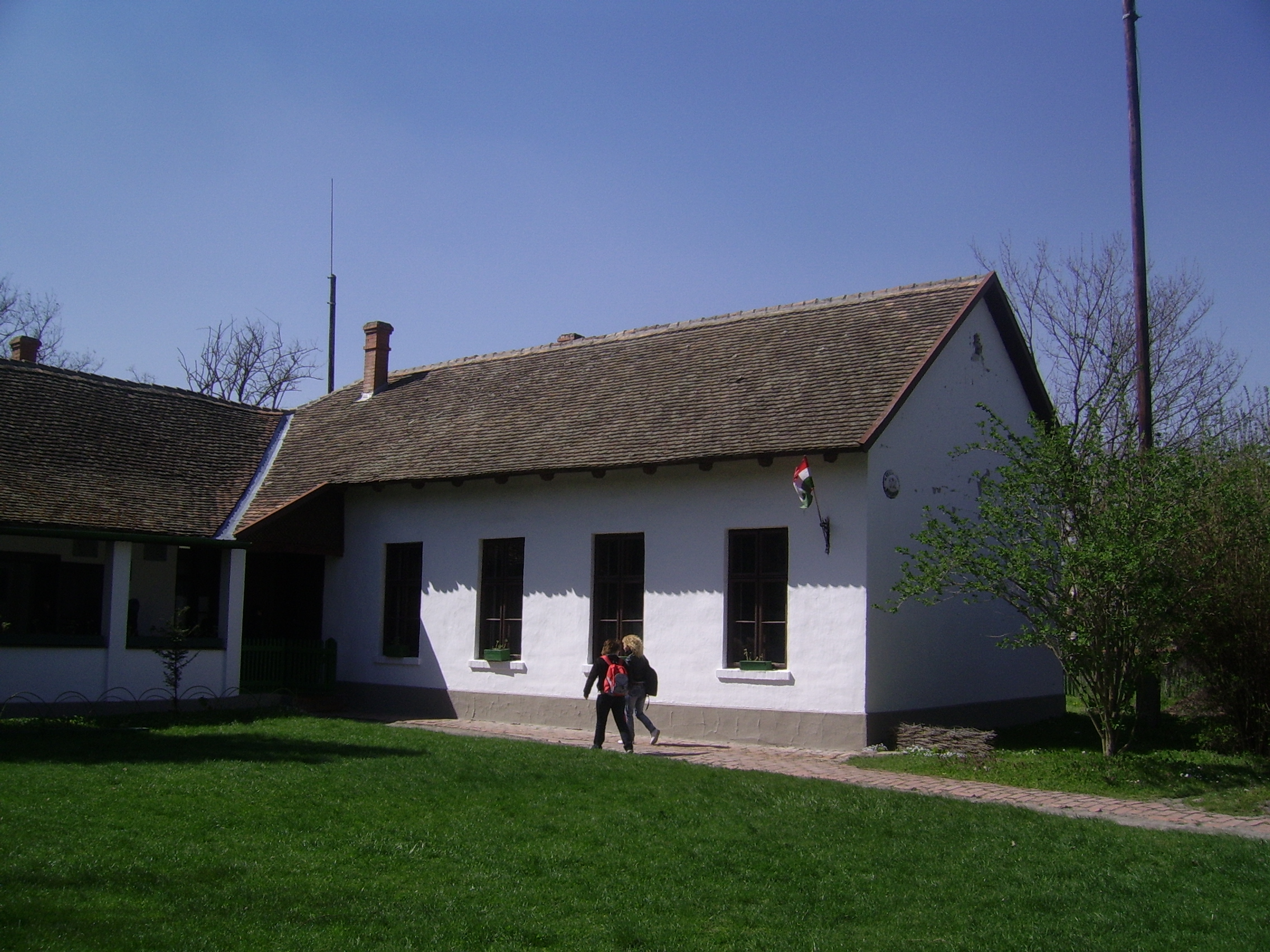
Rural school in Árpádhalom (Pusztaszer)

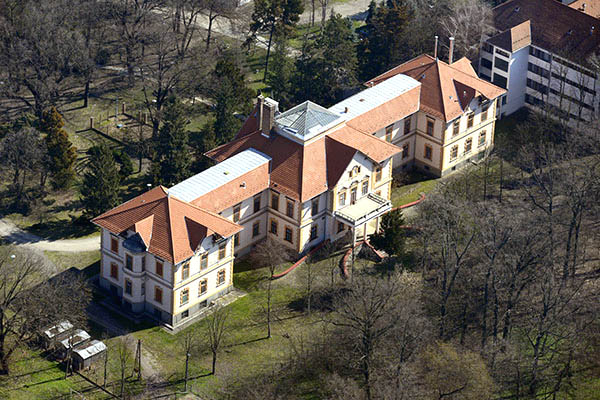
Pallavicini Mansion in Ópusztaszer

== See also ==
- List of cities and towns of Hungary
