= Bence Bárkányi =

Hungarian politician

- Bárkányi in 2026

Member of the National Assembly
- Assuming office 9 May 2026
- Succeeding: Sándor Farkas
- Constituency: Csongrád-Csanád County 3rd

Personal details
- Party: Tisza Party

Bence Bárkányi is a Hungarian politician who was elected member of the National Assembly in 2026. He is the manager of a patient transport company.
