= Károlyi Castle (Szegvár) =

19th-century castle in Szegvár, Hungary

- Károlyi-kastély
- Szegvár, Szentes District, Csongrád-Csanád County, Hungary
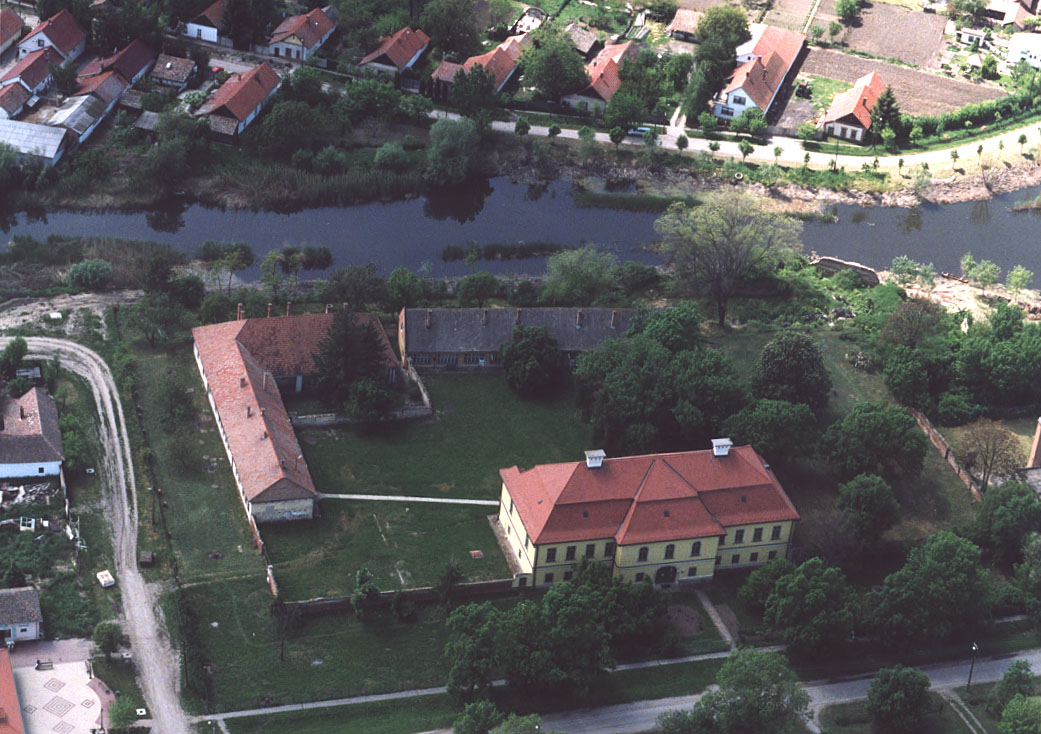

Site information
- Type: Castle

Location
- Location of Károlyi Castle in Hungary
- Coordinates: 46°35′00″N 20°14′00″E

Site history
- Built: 1725–1727
- Built for: Károlyi family

Károlyi Castle is a 19th-century castle located in Szegvár, Szentes District, Csongrád-Csanád County, Hungary.

== History ==
The County Hall was built on the site of the Dóczy Castle. The fortified Dóczy Castle, where the Hungarian King John Zápolya also stayed, was rebuilt by the new owner, Count Sándor Károlyi, between 1725 and 1727, and surrounded by walls after the Turkish period. In 1730, Mátyás Bél wrote: "... Count Sándor Károlyi’s residence, built like a rectangular tower, stands... Inside there are vaults, chambers, wine cellars, the palace in the middle is as magnificent as the entire building. What is beyond is also divided into two small rooms, and there is also a vestibule in the staircase. Then there is a house, which is surrounded on all sides by a wall in the form of a watchtower. From its top, a view of the entire county can be seen. In summer, it is a really healthy and cool dwelling due to the constant air movement, but in winter, due to the lack of fuel, it is unpleasant and cold."

Since Csongrád County did not yet have a seat, or even an officially designated seat at the end of the 18th century, the County Assemblies were held in various settlements. When Szegvár finally became the seat of the county, the Károlyi Castle was acquired from Count Károlyi in 1768 (for 836 forints and 30 krajczars) for use as the county hall. According to contemporaneous documents, an amount equivalent to eight times the purchase price was spent on the renovations. However, during the excavations carried out around 1990, this turned out to be untrue as the old building was not renovated; instead a completely new building one was built slightly south of the old one. Its basement and ground floor are vaulted, its windows are stone-framed, and its gate and some windows have basket arches. The prison stood in the courtyard, which was demolished at the beginning of the 20th century. Sándor Rózsa is said to have been imprisoned here.

At the end of the 19th century, the seat of the County moved to Szentes, so the building in Szegvár was thereafter used as an orphanage, a shelter for the elderly, and a girls' education institution from 1902, under the management of various female religious orders. At one point, the beatified social sister Sára Salkaházi also lived here.

=== Post World War II ===
In 1950 after the end of World War II, the building was nationalized and operated as a foster home until 1997. Since then, the building and its courtyard have been the scene of local events including celebrating village days, church meetings, and exhibitions.

The orphanage, which was built inside of the medieval buildings, caused significant damage to the structure. While excavations began to stabilize the building, it has since stalled, further deteriorating the condition of the ruins.
