= Ibolya Nagy =

Hungarian actress

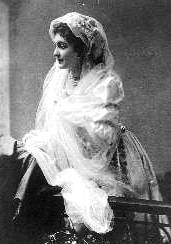
- Born: 9 February 1864; Szentes, Kingdom of Hungary
- Died: 22 August 1946 (aged 82); Budapest, Hungary
- Education: Academy of Drama and Film in Budapest
- Occupation: Actress
- Years active: 1884–1923

Ibolya Nagy (9 February 1864 – 22 August 1946) was a Hungarian actress. From 1884 to 1923, she was an actress at the National Theatre in Budapest.

== Biography ==
A graduate from the Academy of Drama and Film in Budapest, in 1884, she joined the People's Theatre in Budapest. In 1886, she became a member of the National Theatre via contract, and, in 1923, became a life member of the institution.

== Notable roles ==
- Molière: Imaginary Patient - Toinette
- Molière: Tartuffe - Dorine
- Goethe: Faust - Márta
- Ede Szigligeti: Liliomfi - Kamilla
