= Árpád Balázs =

Hungarian classical music composer (born 1937)

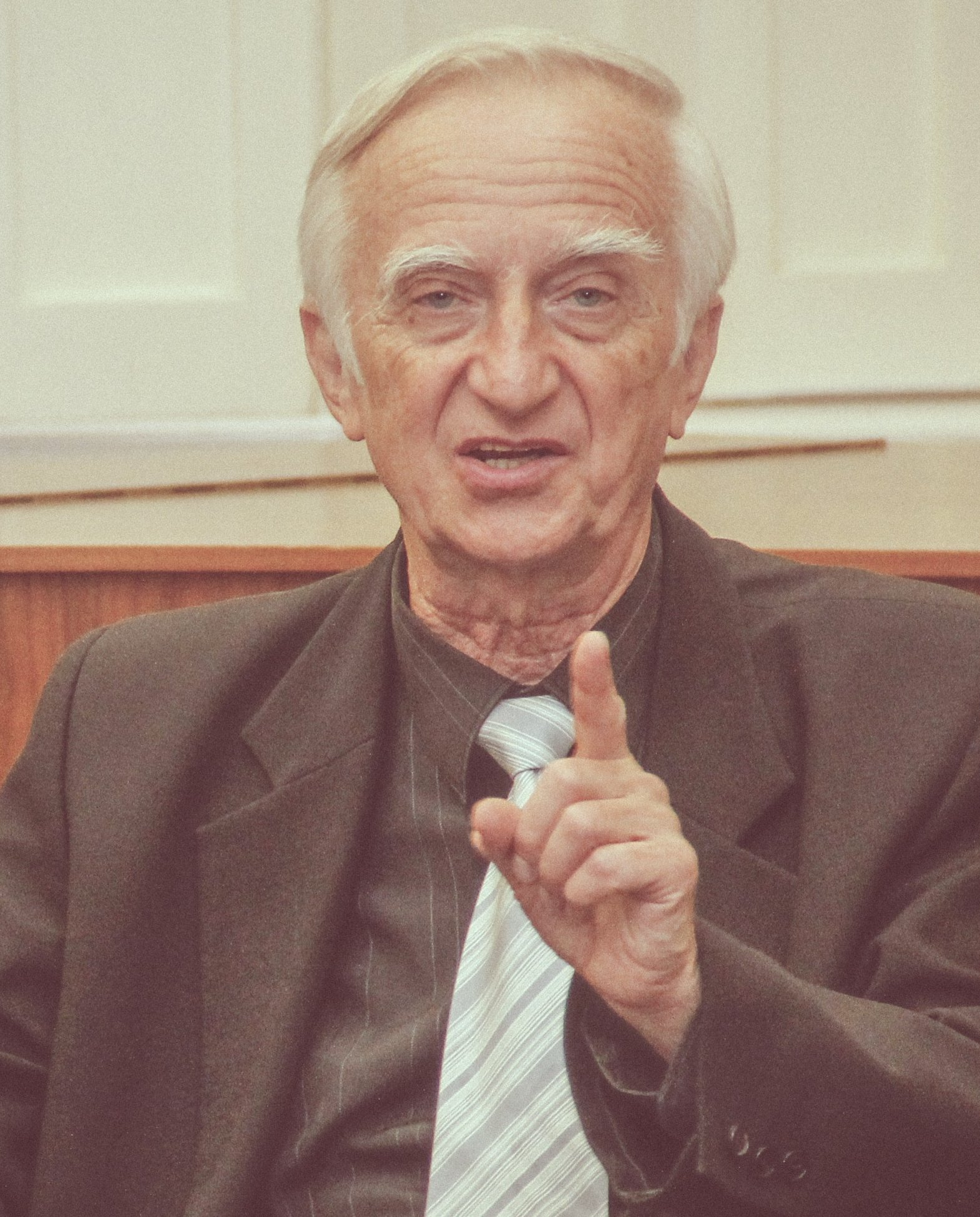
Árpád Balázs in 2012.

Árpád Balázs (born 1 October 1937 in Szentes, Hungary) is a classical music composer. He studied composition in Budapest and Rome, and presented a series about classical music on Hungarian television.

His compositions have been recommended for students learning to play the piano, and in the UK his piece "Trudging" is one of the set performance pieces for the 2009-2010 ABRSM Grade 1 Piano examination.
