= Szentes District =

Administrative district in Csongrád-Csanád, Hungary

Coordinates: 46.6500°N 20.2500°E

Szentes District Szentesi járás
- Districts of Hungary
- Coat of arms

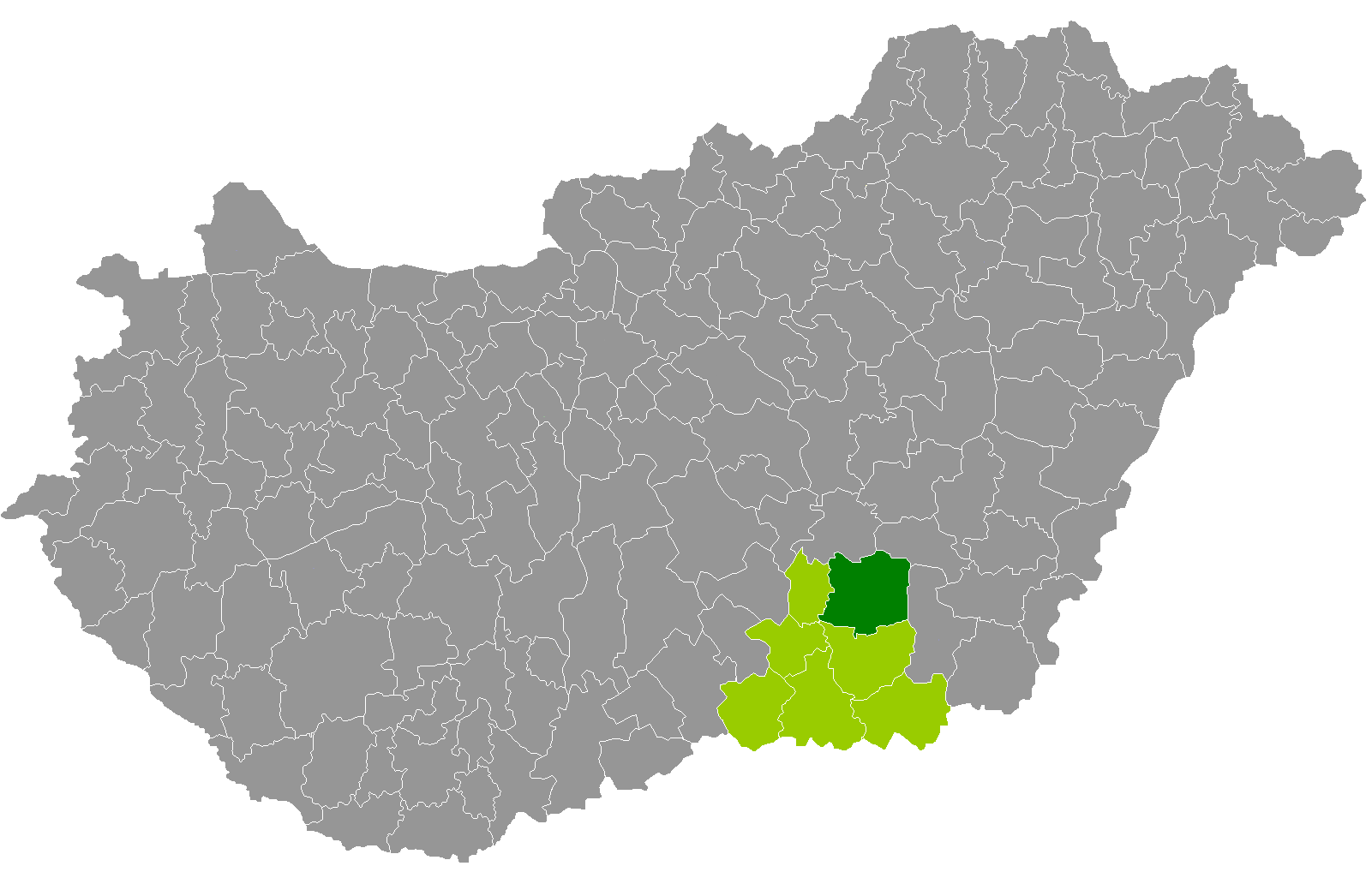
- Szentes District within Hungary and Csongrád County.
- Country: Hungary
- County: Csongrád
- District seat: Szentes

Area
  - Total: 813.84 km^{2} (314.23 sq mi)
  - Rank: 1st in Csongrád

Population (2011 census)
  - Total: 41,328
  - Rank: 4th in Csongrád
  - Density: 51/km^{2} (130/sq mi)

Szentes (Hungarian: Szentesi járás) is a district in north-eastern part of Csongrád County. Szentes is also the name of the town where the district seat is found. The district is located in the Southern Great Plain Statistical Region.

== Geography ==
Szentes District borders with Kunszentmárton District (Jász-Nagykun-Szolnok County) and Szarvas District (Békés County) to the north, Orosháza District (Békés County) to the east, Hódmezővásárhely District to the south, Csongrád District to the west. The number of the inhabited places in Szentes District is 8.

== Municipalities ==
The district has 1 town, 2 large villages and 5 villages. (ordered by population, as of 1 January 2012)

- Árpádhalom (488)
- Derekegyház (1,595)
- Eperjes (495)
- Fábiánsebestyén (2,020)
- Nagymágocs (3,087)
- Nagytőke (457)
- Szegvár (4,440)
- **Szentes** (28,476) – district seat

The bolded municipality is city, italics municipalities are large villages.

== Demographics ==
Religion in Szentes District (2011 census)
1. Catholic Church (27.8%)
2. Greek Catholicism (0.20%)
3. Calvinism (12.0%)
4. Lutheranism (1.00%)
5. Orthodoxy (0.10%)
6. Other religions (0.70%)
7. Non-religious (29.6%)
8. Atheists (1.50%)
9. Undeclared (27.1%)

In 2011, it had a population of 41,328 and the population density was 51/km^{2}.

Year	County population	Change
2011	41,328	n/a

=== Ethnicity ===
Besides the Hungarian majority, the main minorities are the Roma (approx. 600) and German (150).

Total population (2011 census): 41,328
Ethnic groups (2011 census): Identified themselves: 36,753 persons:

- Hungarians: 35,631 (96.95%)
- Gypsies: 569 (1.55%)
- Others and indefinable: 553 (1.50%)

Approx. 4,500 persons in Szentes District did not declare their ethnic group at the 2011 census.

=== Religion ===
Religious adherence in the county according to 2011 census:

- Catholic – 11,572 (Roman Catholic – 11,493; Greek Catholic – 73);
- Reformed – 4,964;
- Evangelical – 413;
- Orthodox – 41;
- other religions – 293;
- Non-religious – 12,244;
- Atheism – 614;
- Undeclared – 11,187.

== Gallery ==
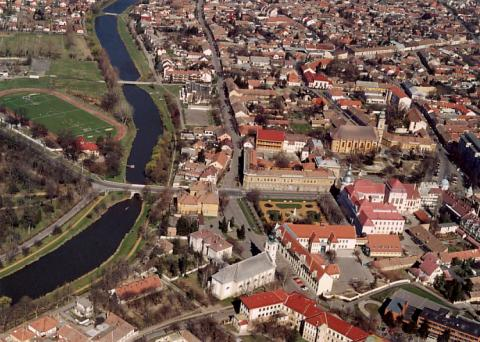
Szentes, the district seat

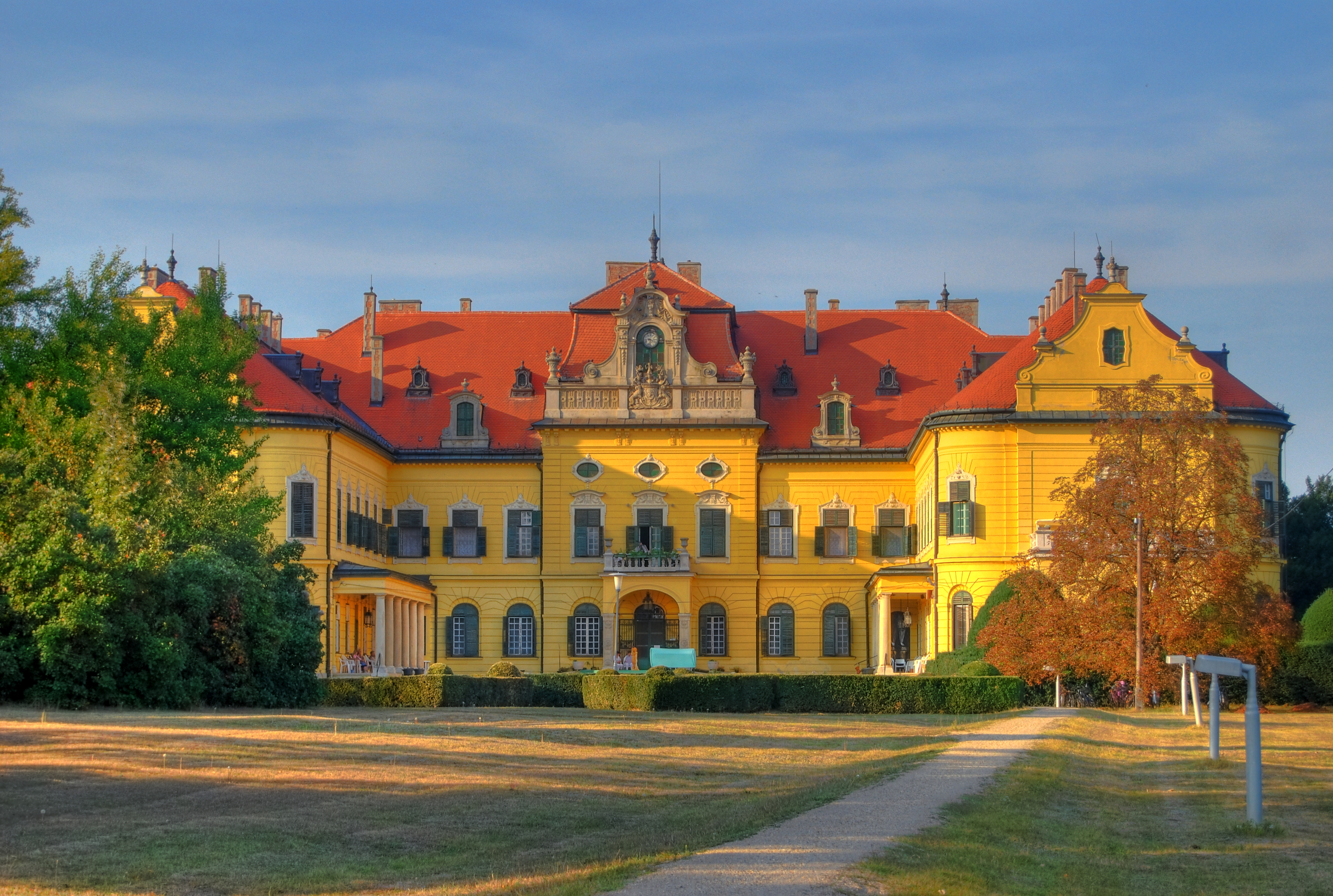
Károlyi Castle in Nagymágocs

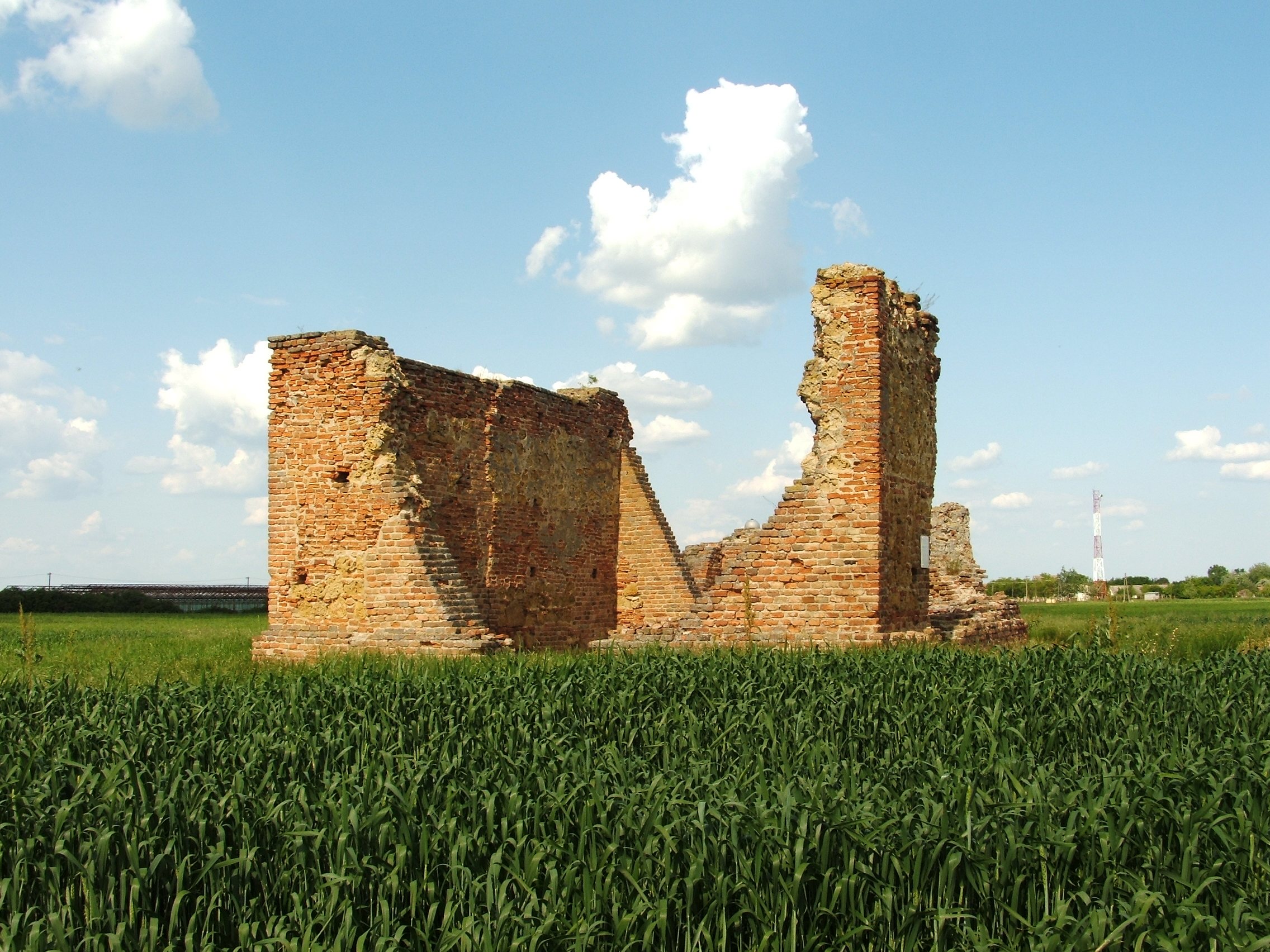
Church ruins of Ecser (Szentes)

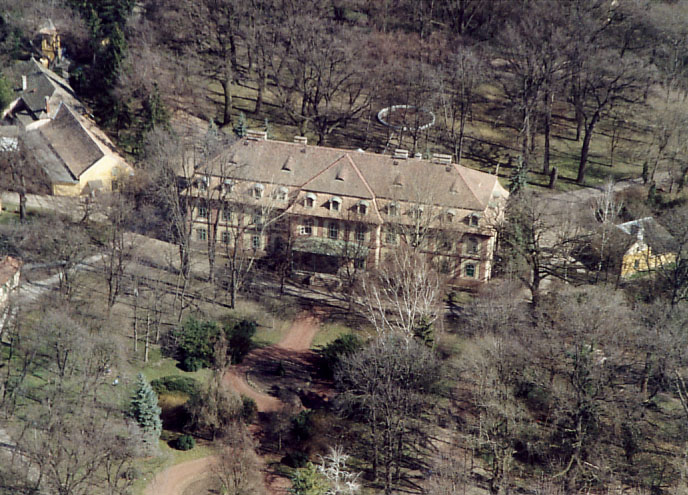
Károlyi Mansion in Derekegyház

== See also ==
- List of cities and towns of Hungary
