= Eperjes =

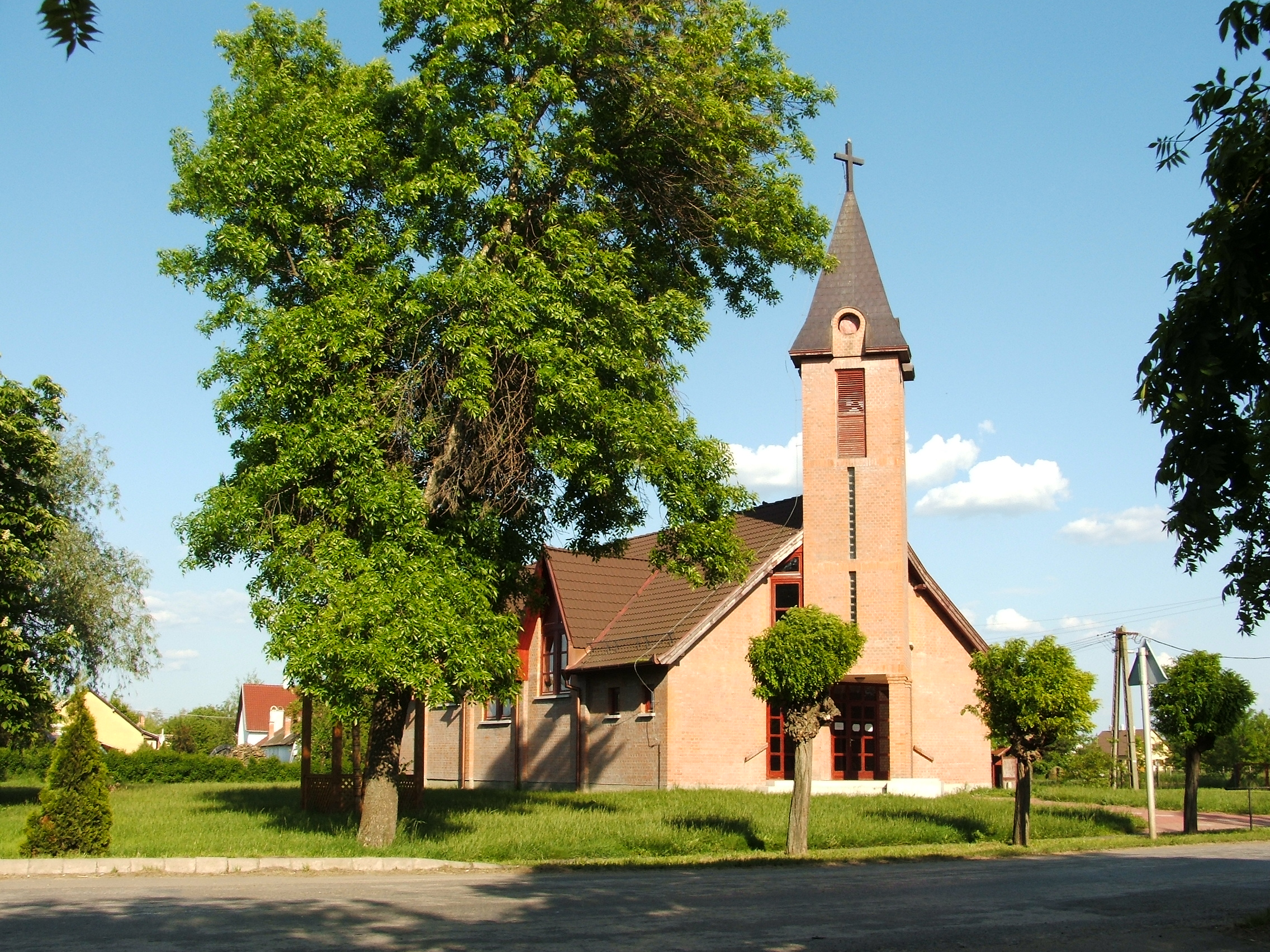
- Saint Ladislaus Church in Eperjes

- Location within Hungary
- Coordinates: 46°42′26″N 20°33′41″E
- Country: Hungary
- County: Csongrád
- District: Szentes

Government
  - Mayor: Kabai Mátyás (Ind.)

Area
  - Total: 73.98 km^{2} (28.56 sq mi)

Population (2024)
  - Total: 380
  - Density: 5.1/km^{2} (13/sq mi)
- Time zone: UTC+1 (CET)
  - Summer (DST): UTC+2 (CEST)
- Postal code: 6624
- Area code: 63

Eperjes is a village in Szentes District of Csongrád County, in the Southern Great Plain region of southern Hungary.

== Geography ==
It covers an area of 73.98 km^{2} (29 sq mi) and has a population of 380 people as of 2024.
