= Ronay (surname) =

Ronay or Rónay is a surname. Notable people with the surname include:

- Barney Ronay, English journalist and author
- Edina Ronay (born 1943), Anglo-Hungarian fashion designer and actress
- Egon Ronay (1915–2010), Anglo-Hungarian food critic
- Esther Ronay (1940–2025), Hungarian-British documentary filmmaker
- Ferenc Rónay (1900–1967), Hungarian-Romanian football player and manager
- Ildikó Rónay-Matuscsák (born 1946), Hungarian fencer
- Matthew Ronay (born 1976), American artist
- Shebah Ronay (born 1972), English actress

== See also ==
- Ronay A. Menschel (born c. 1942), American politician
