= Sándor Farkas =

Hungarian politician

Member of the National Assembly
- In office 18 June 1998 – 8 May 2026

Personal details
- Born: 18 September 1953 (age 72) Szentes, Hungary
- Party: Fidesz (since 1993)
- Spouse: Katalin Farkasné Márton
- Children: 2
- Profession: politician

Sándor Farkas (born 18 September 1953) is a Hungarian politician, member of the National Assembly (MP) for Szentes (Csongrád County Constituency V then III) from 2010 to 2026. He also represented his hometown between 1998 and 2006. He was a Member of Parliament from Csongrád County Regional List from 2006 to 2010.

He joined Fidesz in 1993. Farkas was a member of the Committee on Agriculture from 1998 to 2018 (he presided the committee from 1998 to 2002). He was elected President of the Association of Hungarian Livestock Farmers on 3 March 2016. He served as Parliamentary Secretary of State for Agriculture from 22 May 2018 to 31 May 2025, which he resigned from for health reasons. He was replaced as individual candidate for Szentes by the Fidesz presidium for the 2026 Hungarian parliamentary election. Although his name appeared in his party's national list, he did not secure a mandate.

== Personal life ==
He is married. His wife is Katalin Farkas né Márton. They have two children.
