= Nagymágocs =

Coordinates: 46°35′N 20°30′E

- Large village
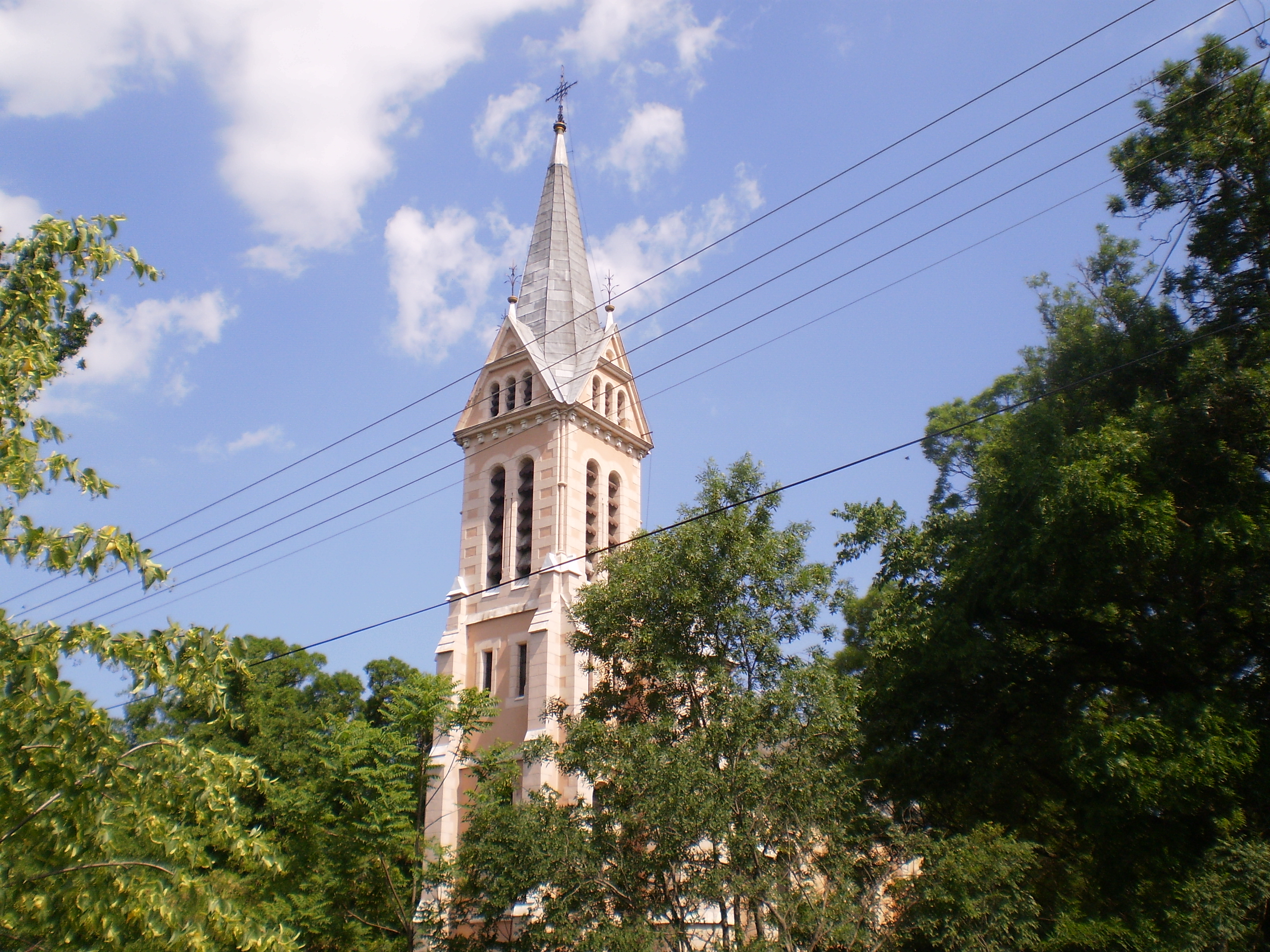
- Roman Catholic church in Nagymágocs

- Coat of arms
- Interactive map of Nagymágocs
- Country: Hungary
- County: Csongrád
- District: Szentes

Area
  - Total: 75.08 km^{2} (28.99 sq mi)

Population (2015)
  - Total: 2,985
  - Density: 39.8/km^{2} (103/sq mi)
- Time zone: UTC+1 (CET)
  - Summer (DST): UTC+2 (CEST)
- Postal code: 6622
- Area code: (+36) 63

Nagymágocs is a village in Csongrád county, in the Southern Great Plain region of southern Hungary.

== Geography ==
It covers an area of 75.08 km^{2} (29 sq mi) and has a population of 2985 people (2015).

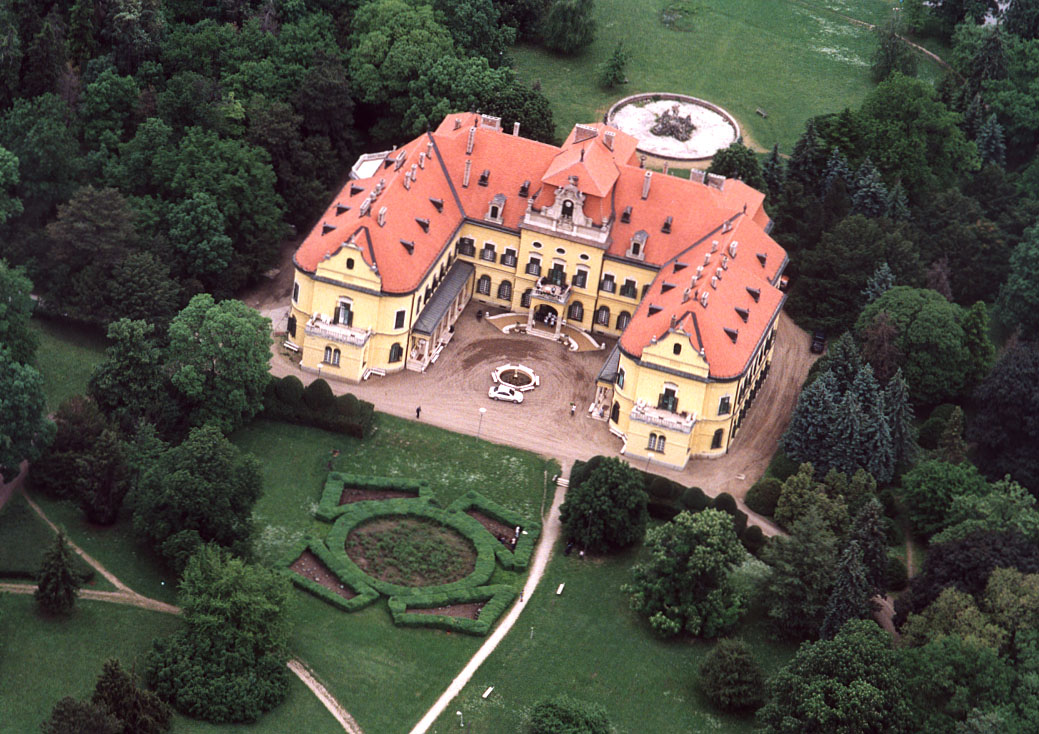
Nagymágocs Palace
