= Pusztaszer =

Coordinates: 46°33′N 19°59′E

- Village
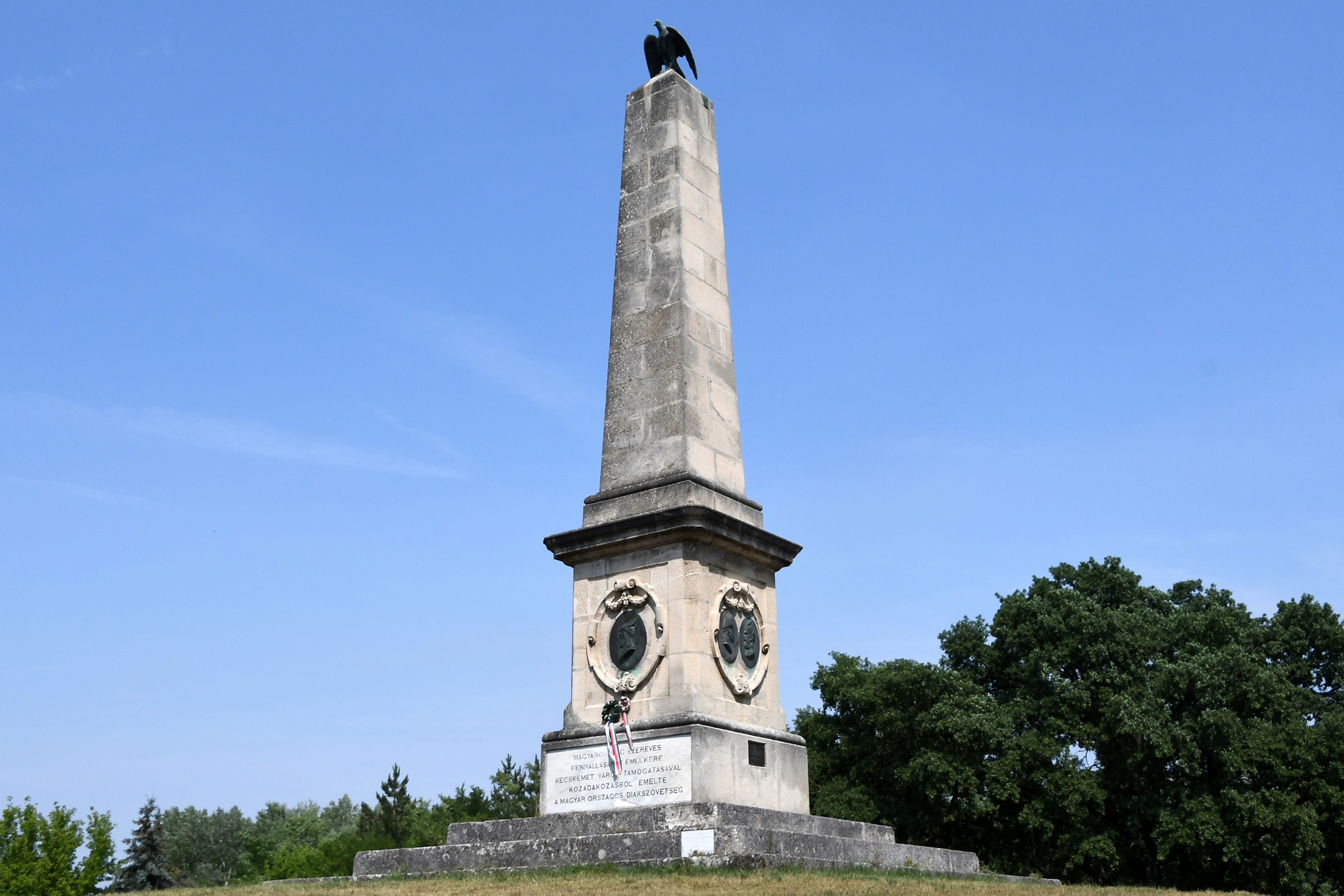
- Memorial of the seven chieftains of the Magyars

- Coat of arms
- Interactive map of Pusztaszer
- Country: Hungary
- County: Csongrád-Csanád

Area
  - Total: 48.93 km^{2} (18.89 sq mi)

Population (2002)
  - Total: 1,674
  - Density: 34/km^{2} (88/sq mi)
- Time zone: UTC+1 (CET)
  - Summer (DST): UTC+2 (CEST)
- Postal code: 6769
- Area code: 62

Pusztaszer is a village in Csongrád-Csanád County, in the Southern Great Plain region of southern Hungary.

== Geography ==
It covers an area of 48.93 km^{2} (19 sq mi) and has a population of 1674 people (2002).

== Sightseeing ==
A National Memorial Park has been established in the neighborhood of the village in memory of the first parliamentary meeting of Hungarians in 895–896. In a great hall the circular panorama painting by Árpád Feszty was rebuilt, and related exhibitions form an important national museum of Hungary.

In the Memorial Park a village museum has also been rebuilt (Skanzen). There, old buildings and workshops, once widespread in the Great Hungarian Plain, can be visited. For example, the old carriage factory consisted of the three workshops: the wheel-makers', the ladder-mount makers', and the master blacksmith's.

Ruins of an old Benedictine monastery of Romanesque style were also excavated in Pusztaszer. The foundations can be seen and the western doorway is partly reconstructed.

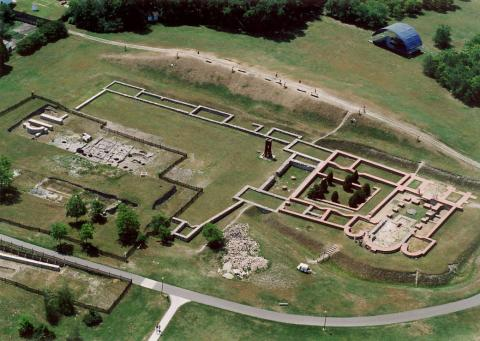
The ruins of the Pusztaszer Benedictine Monastery.

Sculptures of old Hungarian kings and princes populate a historical sculptural memorial garden.
