= Balástya =

Coordinates: 46°25′N 20°01′E

- Village
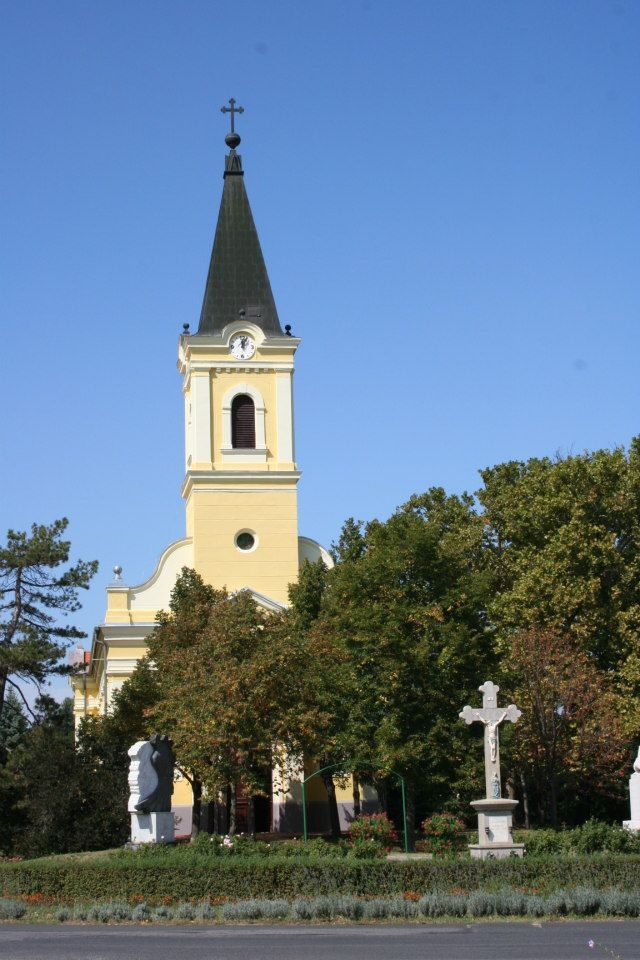
- Church of Saint Anthony in Balástya

- Coat of arms
- Interactive map of Balástya
- Country: Hungary
- County: Csongrád

Area
  - Total: 110 km^{2} (42 sq mi)

Population (2015)
  - Total: 3,436
  - Density: 31.3/km^{2} (81/sq mi)
- Time zone: UTC+1 (CET)
  - Summer (DST): UTC+2 (CEST)
- Postal code: 6764
- Area code: 62

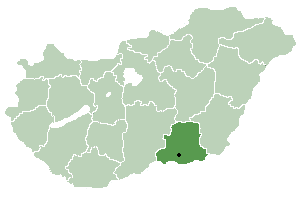
Location of Csongrád County in Hungary

Balástya is a village in Csongrád County, in the Southern Great Plain region of southern Hungary.

== Geography ==
It covers an area of 110 km^{2} (42 sq mi) and has a population of 3436 people (2015).
