= Szegvár =

Coordinates: 46°35′N 20°14′E

- Large village
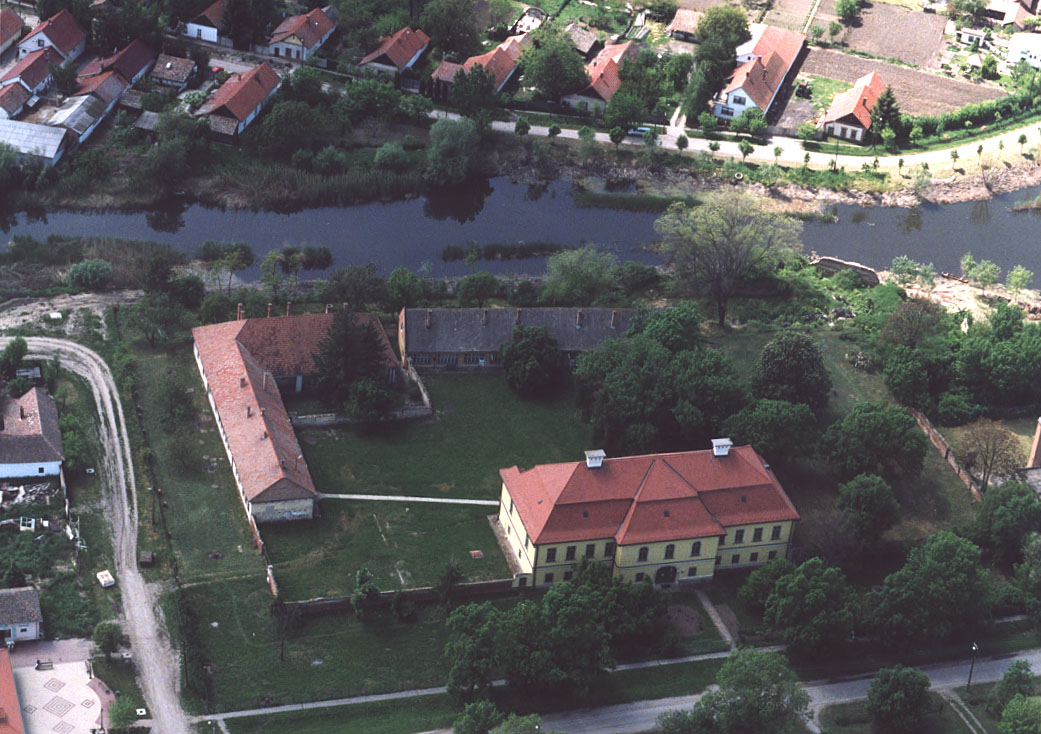
- Aerial photograph of Károlyi Castle

- Coat of arms
- Interactive map of Szegvár
- Country: Hungary
- County: Csongrád-Csanád
- District: Szentes

Area
  - Total: 86.22 km^{2} (33.29 sq mi)

Population (2015)
  - Total: 4,385
  - Density: 50.9/km^{2} (132/sq mi)
- Time zone: UTC+1 (CET)
  - Summer (DST): UTC+2 (CEST)
- Postal code: 6635
- Area code: (+36) 63

Szegvár is a large village in Csongrád County, in the Southern Great Plain region of southern Hungary.

== Geography ==
It covers an area of 86.22 km^{2} (33 sq mi) and has a population of 4385 people (2015).
