= Csengele =

Coordinates: 46°32′N 19°52′E

- Village
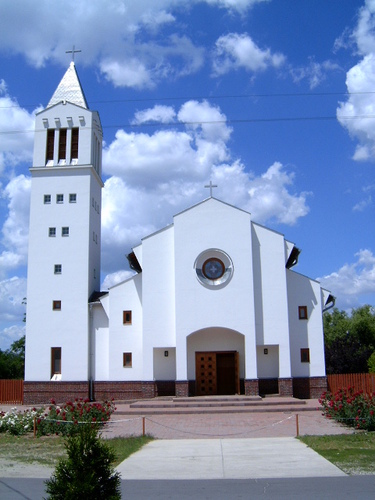
- Saint Emeric church in Csengele

- Coat of arms
- Interactive map of Csengele
- Country: Hungary
- County: Csongrád

Area
  - Total: 60.66 km^{2} (23.42 sq mi)

Population (2015)
  - Total: 2,006
  - Density: 33.1/km^{2} (86/sq mi)
- Time zone: UTC+1 (CET)
  - Summer (DST): UTC+2 (CEST)
- Postal code: 6765
- Area code: 62

Csengele is a village in Csongrád County, in the Southern Great Plain region of southern Hungary.

== Geography ==
It covers an area of 60.66 km^{2} (23 sq mi) and has a population of 2006 people (2015).
