= Ópusztaszer =

Coordinates: 46°29′N 20°05′E

- Village
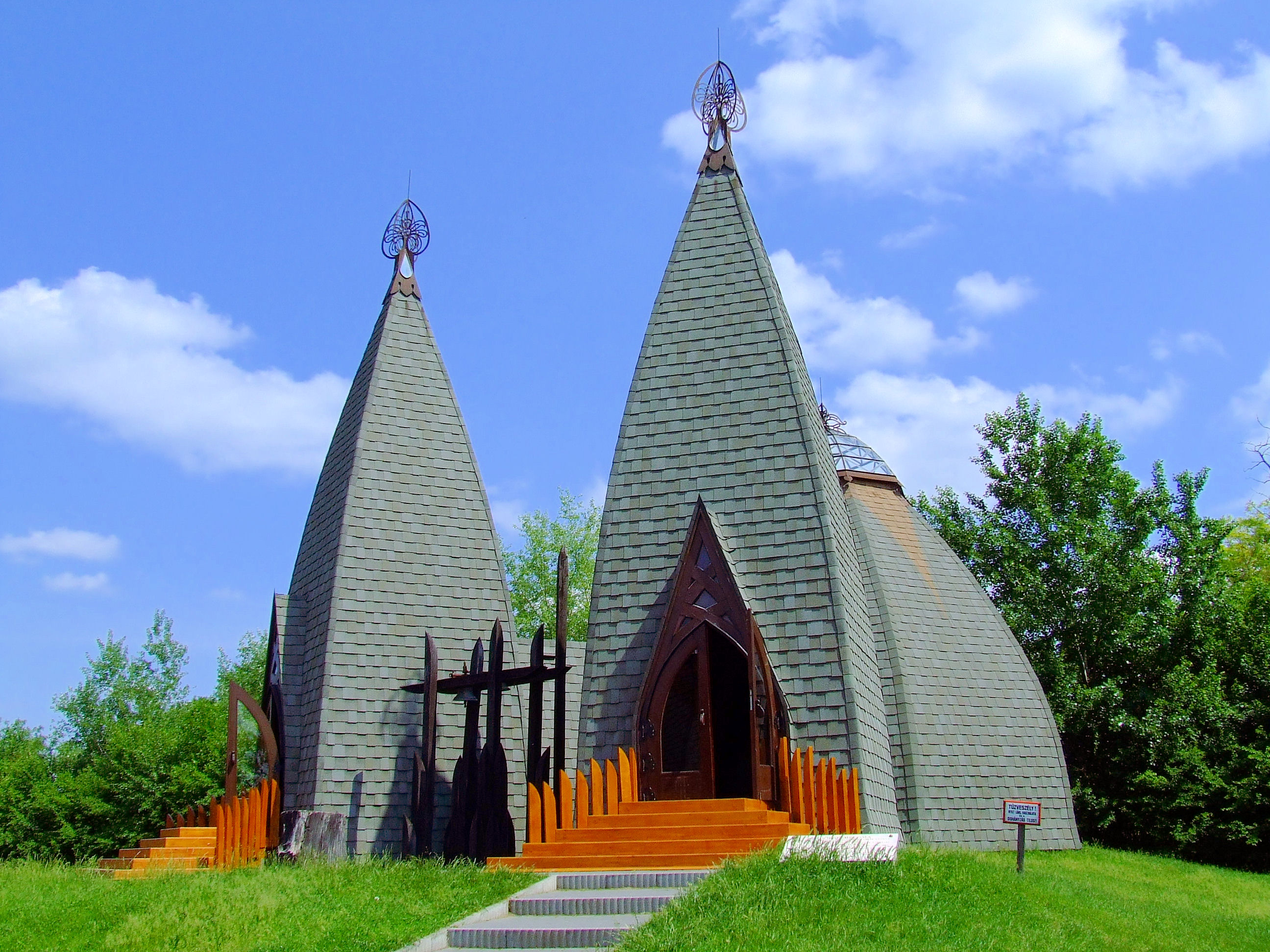
- Forest Temple in Ópusztaszer

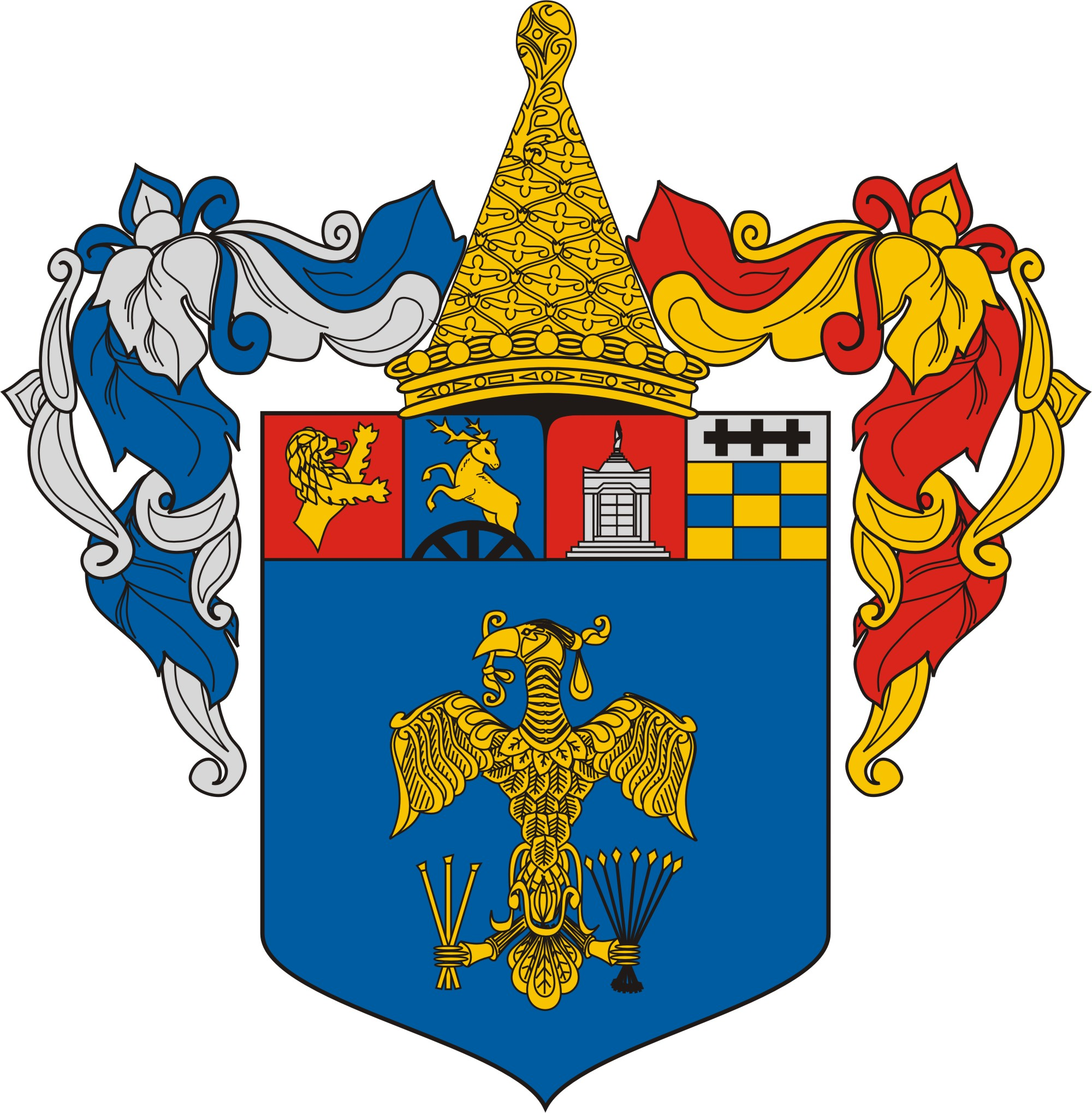
- Coat of arms
- Interactive map of Ópusztaszer
- Country: Hungary
- County: Csongrád-Csanád
- District: Kistelek

Area
  - Total: 59.50 km^{2} (22.97 sq mi)

Population (2001)
  - Total: 2,290
  - Density: 38.5/km^{2} (100/sq mi)
- Time zone: UTC+1 (CET)
  - Summer (DST): UTC+2 (CEST)
- Postal code: 6767
- Area code: (+36) 62

Ópusztaszer (till 1973 Sövényháza) is a village in Csongrád-Csanád County, in the Southern Great Plain region of southern Hungary. It is most known as the location of the Ópusztaszer National Heritage Park.

== Geography ==
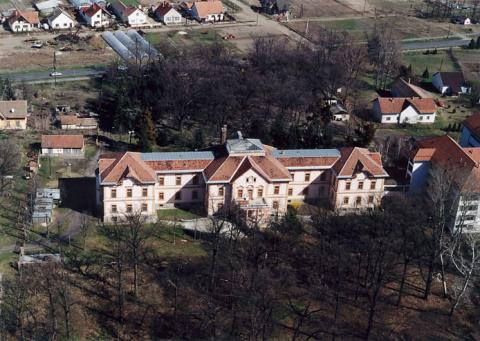
Ópusztaszer, palace from above

It covers an area of 59.5 km^{2} (23 sq mi) and has a population of 2,290 people (2001).
