= Baks =

- Village
- Coat of arms

- Location of Baks in Hungary
- Coordinates: 46°33′N 20°6′E
- Country: Hungary
- County: Csongrád

Area
  - Total: 61.92 km^{2} (23.91 sq mi)

Population (2016)
  - Total: 2,300
  - Density: 37.05/km^{2} (96.0/sq mi)
- Time zone: UTC+1 (CET)
  - Summer (DST): UTC+2 (CEST)
- Postal code: 6768
- Area code: 62

Baks is a village in Csongrád County, in the Southern Great Plain region of southern Hungary.

== Geography ==
It covers an area of 61.92 km^{2} (24 sq mi) and has a population of 2300 people (2016).

== History ==
Human settlement in the village dates back at least to the late Bronze Age, as classical Gáva-Holigrady culture artifacts have been found in Baks along the Tisza River.
