= Árpádhalom =

- Village
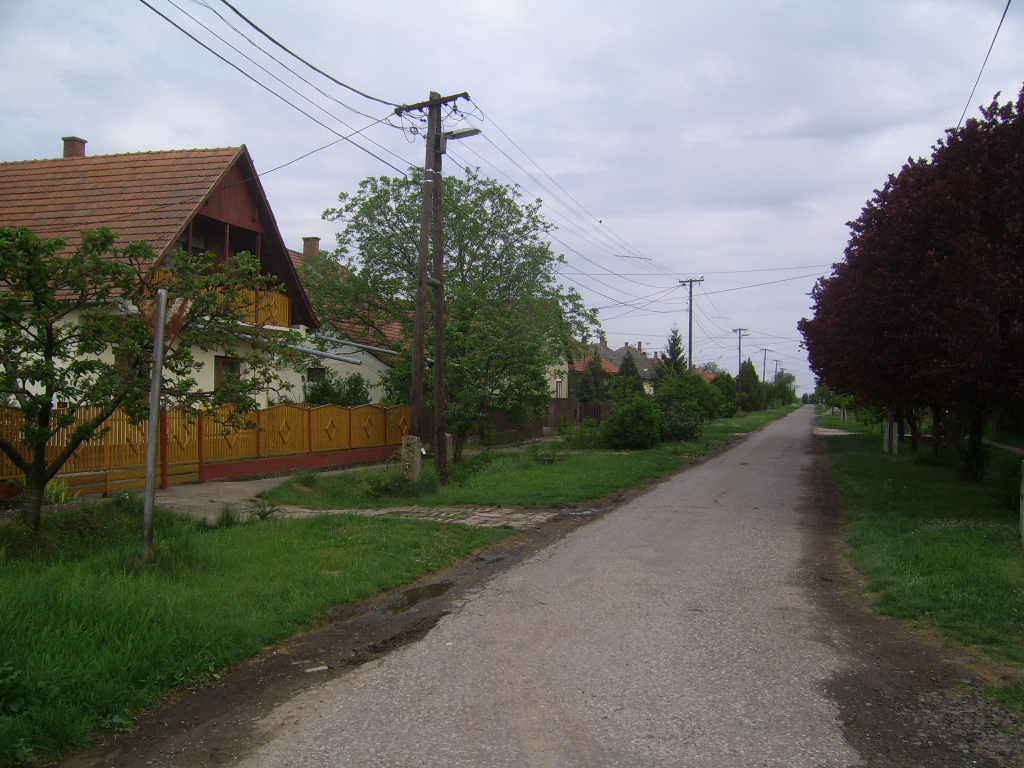
- A street in Árpádhalom

- Coat of arms

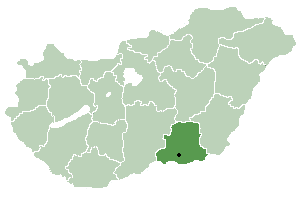

- Location within Hungary
- Coordinates: 46°37′N 20°33′E
- Country: Hungary
- County: Csongrád

Government
  - Mayor: Vágó Miklós Béla (Ind.)

Area
  - Total: 45.20 km^{2} (17.45 sq mi)

Population (2022)
  - Total: 393
  - Density: 8.69/km^{2} (22.5/sq mi)
- Time zone: UTC+1 (CET)
  - Summer (DST): UTC+2 (CEST)
- Postal code: 6623
- Area code: 63

Árpádhalom is a village in Csongrád County, in the Southern Great Plain region of southern Hungary.

== Geography ==
It covers an area of 45.20 km^{2} (17 sq mi) and has a population of 393 people (2022).
