= Szentes =

- Town
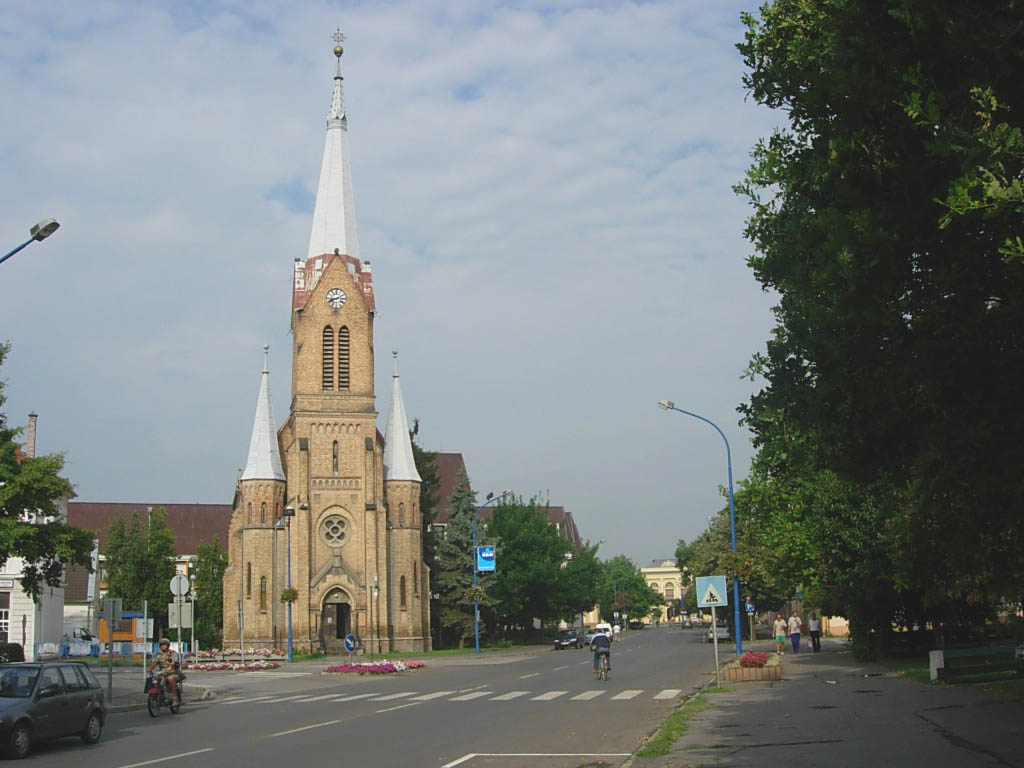
- Near the center of the town with Lutheran Church

- Flag Coat of arms

- Location within Csongrád County Location within Hungary
- Coordinates: 46.651°N 20.258°E
- Country: Hungary
- County: Csongrád
- District: Szentes

Area
  - Total: 353.25 km^{2} (136.39 sq mi)

Population (2015)
  - Total: 27,898
  - Density: 78.975/km^{2} (204.54/sq mi)
- Time zone: UTC+1 (CET)
  - Summer (DST): UTC+2 (CEST)
- Postal code: 6600
- Area code: (+36) 63
- Website: szentes.hu

Szentes (Hungarian pronunciation: [ˈsɛntɛʃ]) is a town in south-eastern Hungary, Csongrád county, near the Tisza river. The town is a cultural and educational center of the region. It is the third most populous town in Csongrad county after Szeged and Hódmezővásárhely. Szentes is 82,6 km away from Kerekegyháza.

== History ==
The area around Szentes has been inhabited since the Neolithic. The Szegvár-tűzkövesi idol, one of the Neolithic period's only depictions of a male deity, was discovered in the area. During the barbarian invasions, many ethnic groups moved through the region, and there is archeological evidence of hundreds of graves belonging to Iazyges, Sarmatians, Gepids, Huns, and Avars. According to certain accounts, the legendary camp of Atilla the Hun was found in this area, at the confluence of the Tisza and the Körös rivers. The town was first documented about the land-division in 1332 and called "Scenthus". It was said to be inhabited by descendants of the tribe of Ond, one of the seven tribes of Hungary, and it was also documented as containing a stone church dedicated to Andrew the Apostle. According to local tradition, Csongrad castle stood on the town's boundaries until the time of the first Mongol invasion.

Following the Hungary's defeat by Ottoman forces at the battle of Mohács, taxes were levied from Szentes by three different powers, meaning those who were able to leave the area, fled. The region suffered immensely under Ottoman rule, and entire towns were wiped off the map. The region further suffered during the Long Turkish War, with more towns going extinct, and many of Szentes' inhabitants seeking refuge by dwelling in the nearby wetlands. In 1647, Ferdinand III was defeated by Ottoman forces outside Szentes, but the Ottoman forces had to withdraw from the region. In 1693, Szentes and the surrounding region was scorched and pillaged by Crimean Tatars looking for food following their failed attempt to capture Gyula. In 1709, the town suffered an outbreak of the Plague, killing over 1000 of its inhabitants.

The townsfolk played an active role in the Hungarian Revolution of 1848, and it was visited by Kossuth Lajos himself to recruit troops. After the Habsburgs crushed the revolution, many young men were forcibly enlisted in the Imperial Army as punishment, and the mayor was sentenced to hard labour.

== Notable people ==
- Árpád Balázs (born 1937), classical music composer
- János Bácskai 1954. november 27, actor
- János Berkes (born 1946 May 24) opera singer (tenor)
- István Bugyi (1898–1981) surgeon - The local hospital named after him
- Dóra Dúró (born 1987), politician
- Jozsef Gera (born 1937) aircraft engineer, former chief of the Dynamics and Controls Branch at NASA
- László Gyimesi (born 1948), pianist
- Mihály Horváth (1809–1878), Roman Catholic bishop
- Tamás Kecskés (born 1986), footballer
- Zsolt Koncz (born 1977), footballer
- László Márkus (1881–1948), drama author, director, member of the Hungarian Opera
- András Mészáros (born 1941), former cyclist
- Ibolya Nagy (1864–1946), actress
- Lajos Őze (1935–1984), actor
- László Papp (1905–1989), wrestler
- István Szelei (born 1960), fencer
- Lajos Szilassi (born 1942), mathematician
- Konrád Verebélyi (born 1995), footballer
- Zséda (born 1974), singer
- László Terney (1947–1998), architect
- Tóth Barna (born 1999), econometrician
- László Ujréti (born 1942) actor, voice actor
- Péter Szalay (chemist) (born 1962), quantum chemist, theoretical chemist

== Twin towns – sister cities ==
Szentes is twinned with:

- Bačka Topola, Serbia
- Buñol, Spain
- Dumbrăvița, Romania
- Hof Ashkelon, Israel
- Kaarina, Finland
- Markgröningen, Germany
- Sankt Augustin, Germany
- Sfântu Gheorghe, Romania
- Skierniewice, Poland
- Svätuše, Slovakia

== Gallery ==
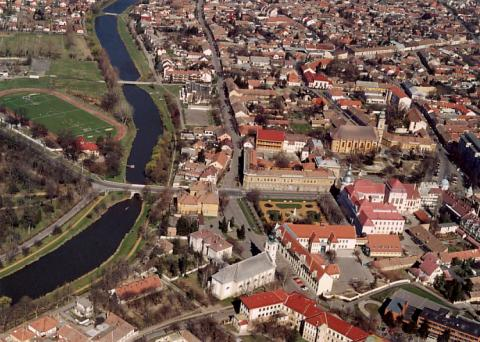

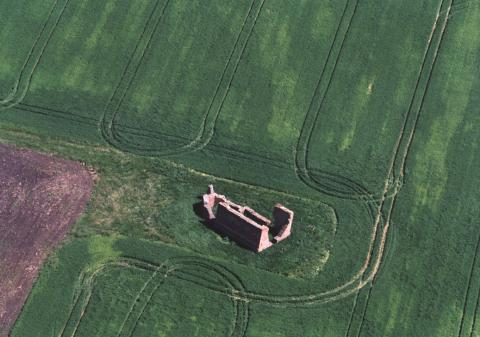

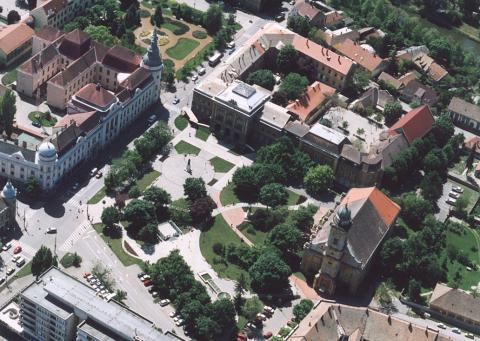
