= Derekegyház =

Coordinates: 46°35′N 20°22′E

- Village
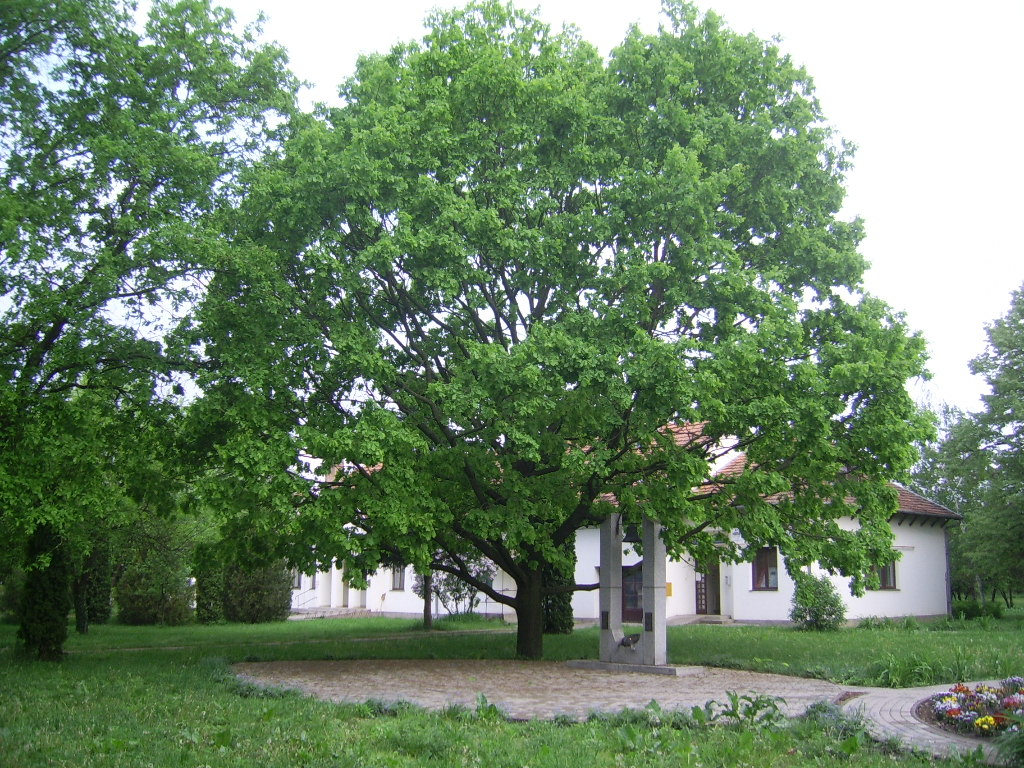
- Main square of Derekegyház

- Coat of arms
- Interactive map of Derekegyház
- Country: Hungary
- County: Csongrád

Area
  - Total: 53.79 km^{2} (20.77 sq mi)

Population (2015)
  - Total: 1,584
  - Density: 29.5/km^{2} (76/sq mi)
- Time zone: UTC+1 (CET)
  - Summer (DST): UTC+2 (CEST)
- Postal code: 6621
- Area code: 63

Derekegyház is a village in Csongrád county, in the Southern Great Plain region of southern Hungary.

== Geography ==
It covers an area of 53.79 km^{2} (21 sq mi) and has a population of 1584 people (2015).
