= Károlyi Castle =

Castles owned by the Károlyi family

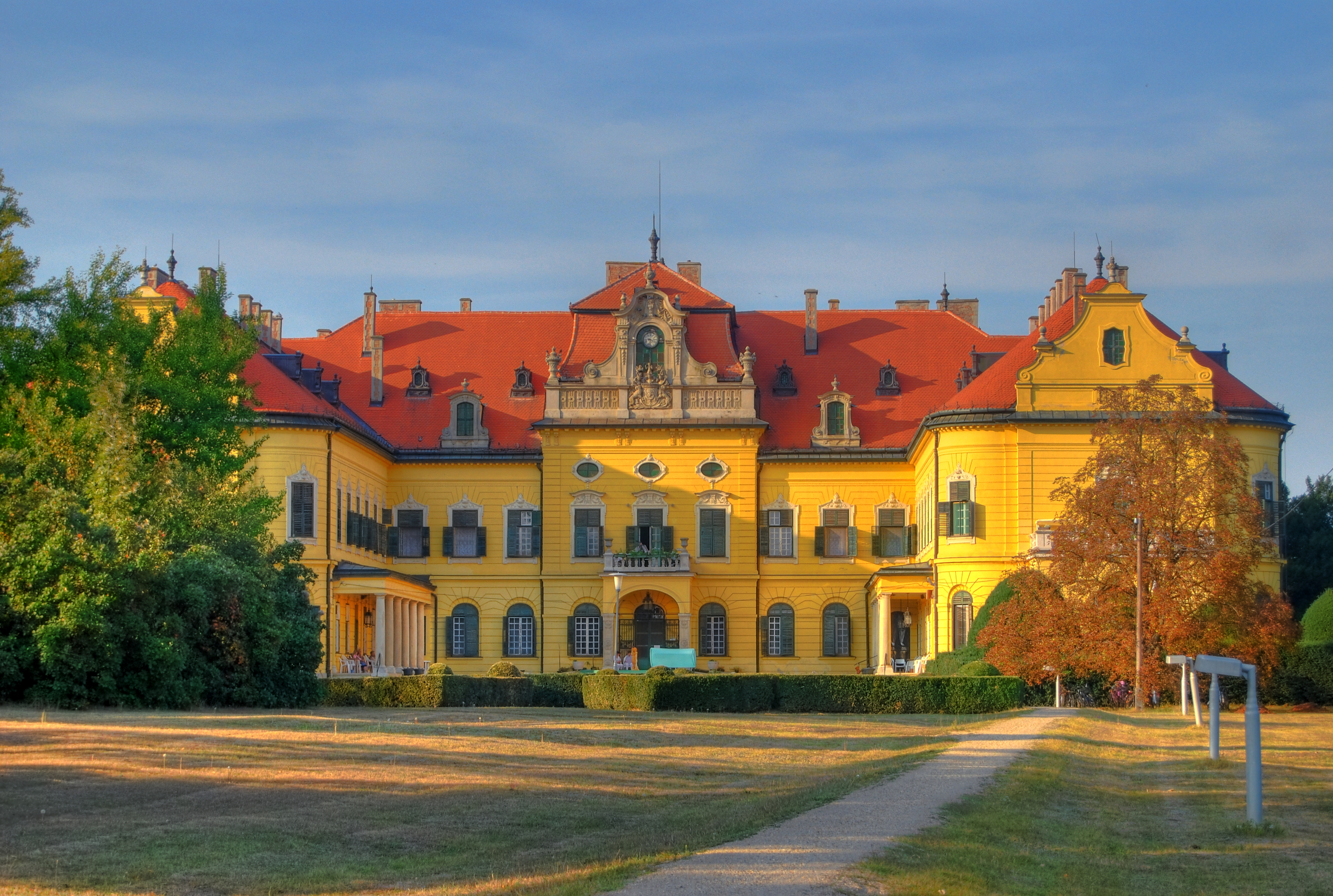
Károlyi Castle (Nagymágocs)

Károlyi Castle refers to a number of castles and hunting lodges in Hungary and Romania which were owned by members of the Károlyi family

== History ==
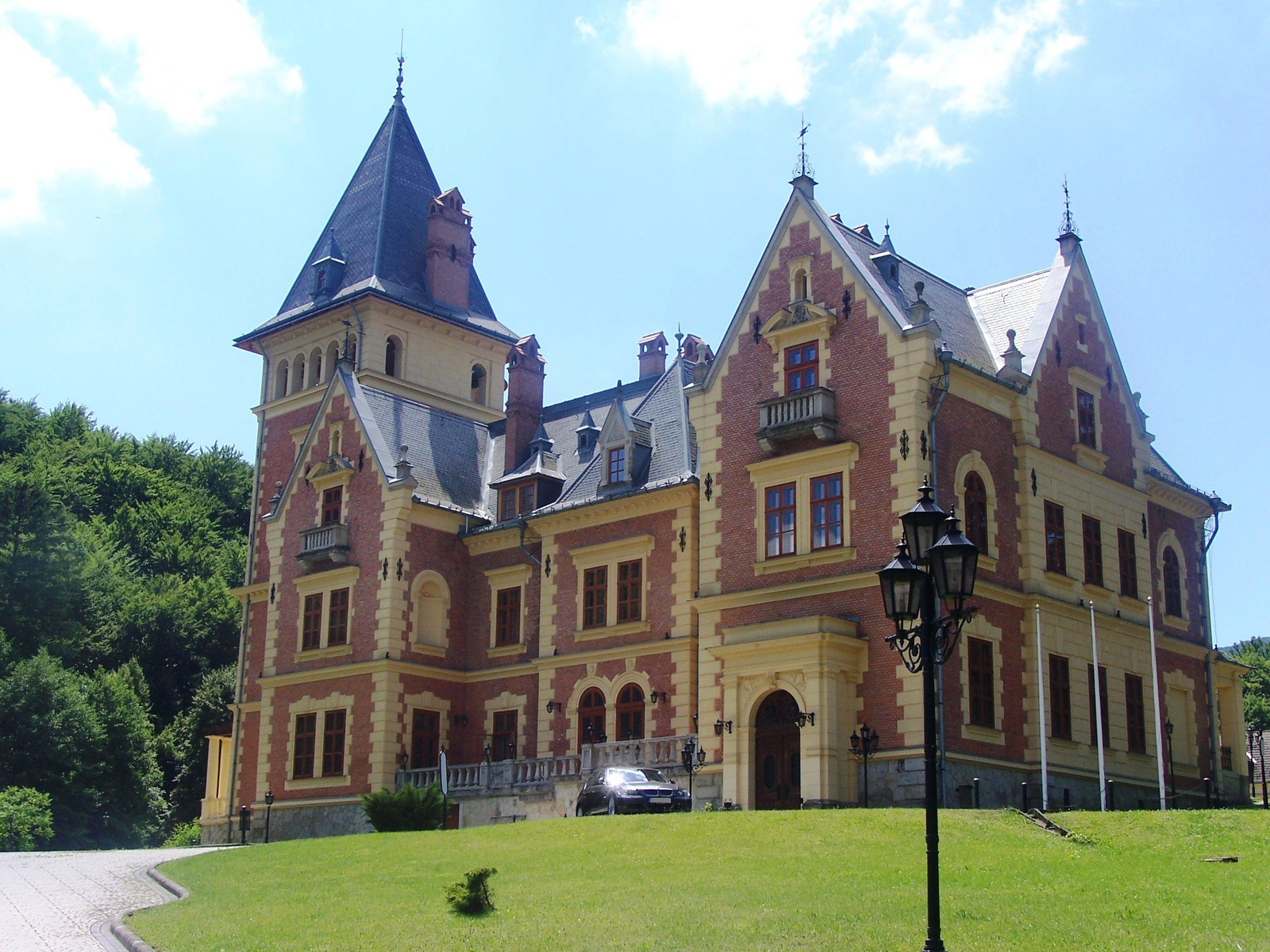
Károlyi Castle (Parádsasvár)

The Károlyi family is one of the ancient Hungarian noble families. Descendants of the Kaplon family (descendants of the Kaplon, second son of the chieftain Kond), which gained its estates during the conquest, including Kaplony (Romanian: Căpleni), where the family's ancient monastery stood, and the nearby Nagykároly (Romanian: Carei), from which the Károlyi family took its name.

== Castles and hunting lodges ==
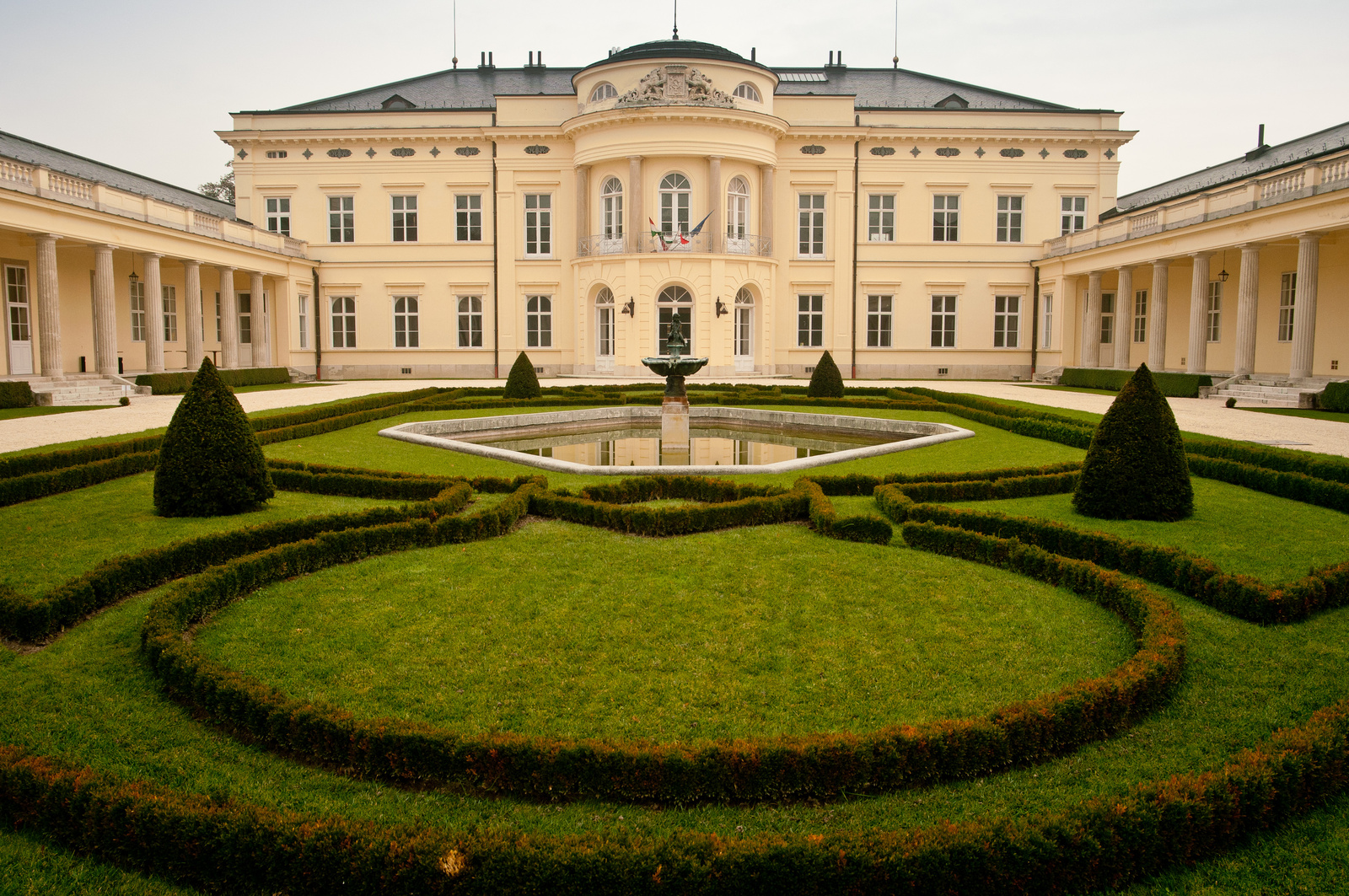
Károlyi Castle (Fehérvárcsurgó)

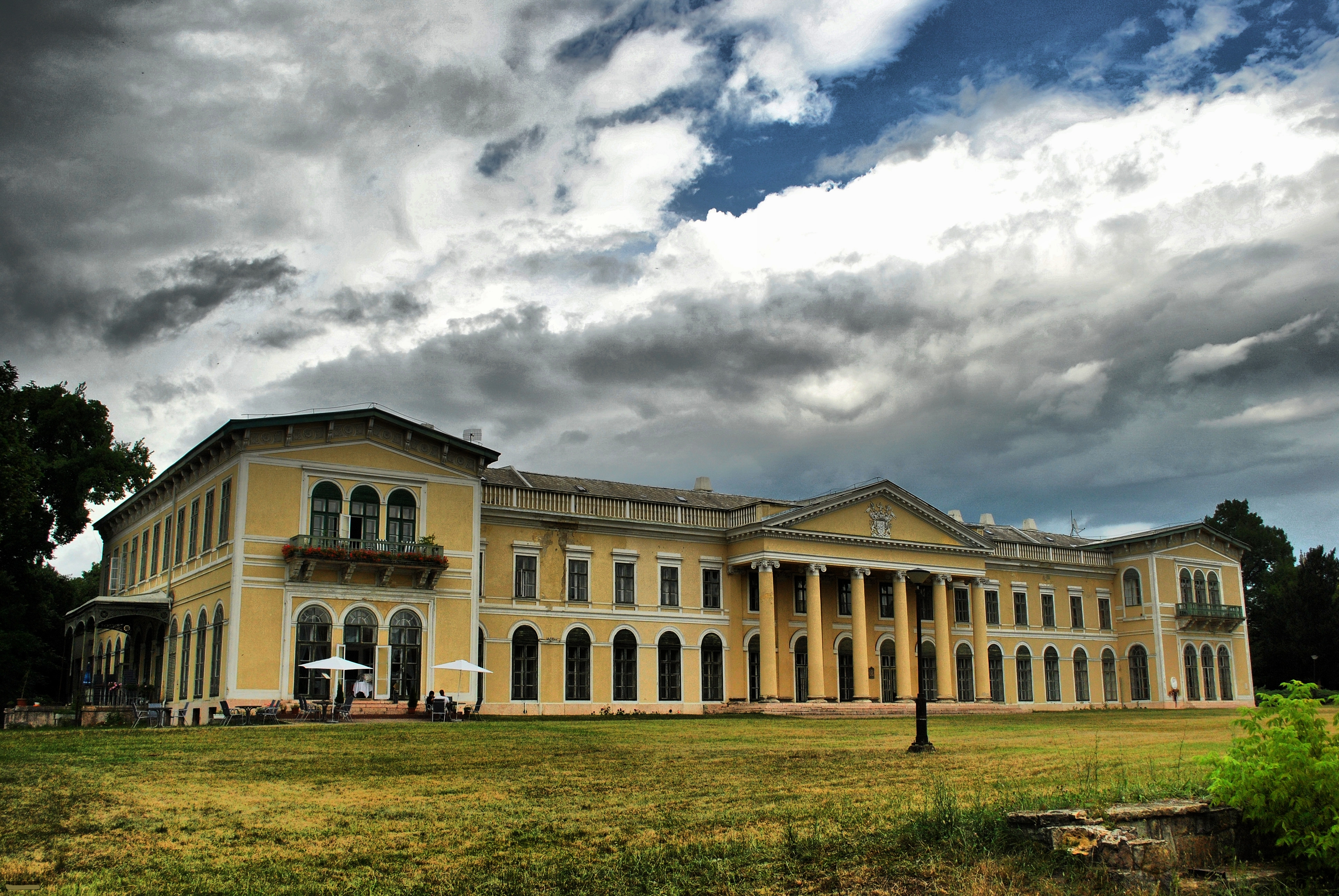
Károlyi Castle (Fót)

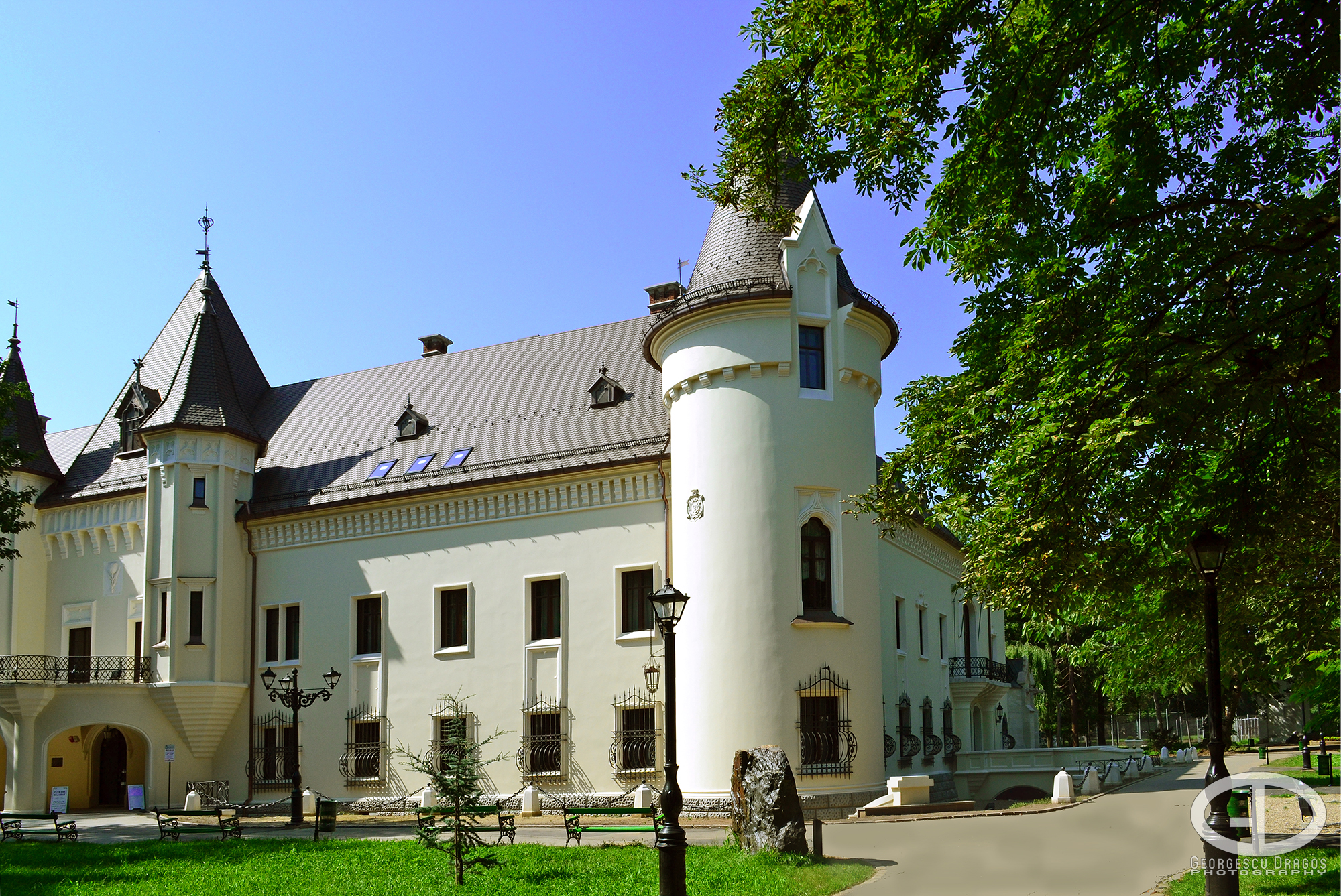
Károlyi Castle (Carei)

=== Hungary ===
- Károlyi Castle (Beregsurány)
- Károlyi Castle (Fehérvárcsurgó)
- Károlyi Castle (Feldebrő)
- Károlyi Castle (Fót)
- Károlyi Castle (Füzérradvány)
- Károlyi Castle (Derekegyház)
- Károlyi Castle (Nagymágocs)
- Károlyi Castle (Parádfürdő)
- Károlyi Castle (Parádsasvár)
- Károlyi Castle (Szegvár)
- Károlyi Castle (Tiborszállás)
- Károlyi–Berchtold Castle
- Károlyi Hunting Lodge (Kőkapu)
- Károlyi Hunting Lodge (Telkibánya)

=== Romania ===
- Károlyi Castle (Carei)

== See also ==
- Károlyi family
- Károlyi Palace
