= Károlyi Castle (Fehérvárcsurgó) =

19th-century castle in Fehérvárcsurgó, Fejér County, Hungary

- Károlyi-kastély
- Fehérvárcsurgó, Mór District, Fejér County, Hungary
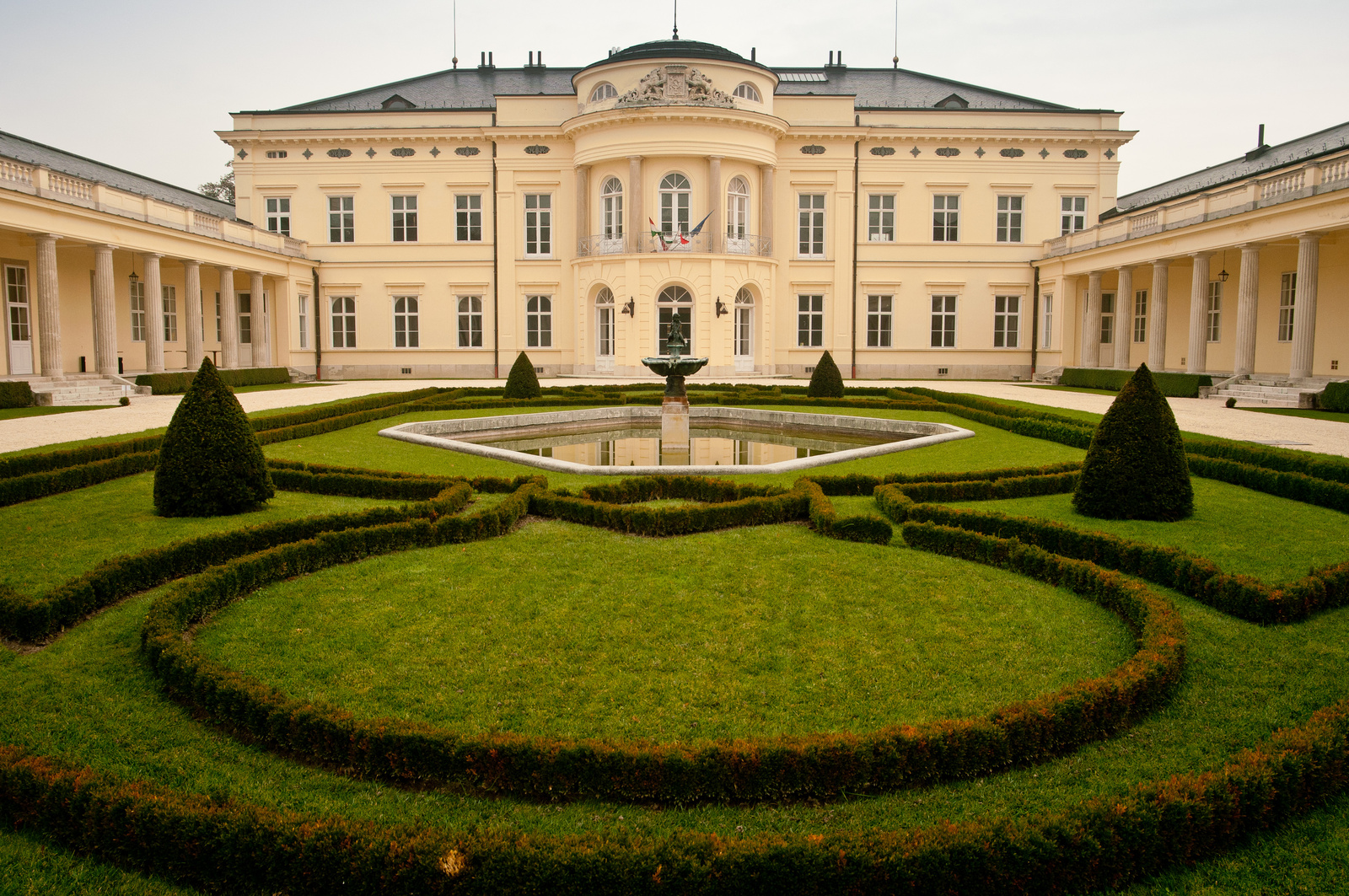
- The Castle, October 2010

Site information
- Type: Castle
- Owner: Government of Hungary
- Open to the public: Yes

Location
- Location of Károlyi Castle in Hungary
- Location within Hungary
- Coordinates: 47°17′15.91″N 18°15′54.8″E

Site history
- Built: 1844–1851
- Built for: Károlyi family
- Architect: Henrich Koch, Miklós Ybl

Károlyi Castle is a 19th-century castle located in Fehérvárcsurgó, Mór District, Fejér County, Hungary. The castle was built in classicist and eclectic style by György Károlyi, a descendant of the Károlyi family, and was designed by architects Henrich Koch and Miklós Ybl. The building currently houses a 23-room hotel, but can be visited with a guided tour.

== History ==
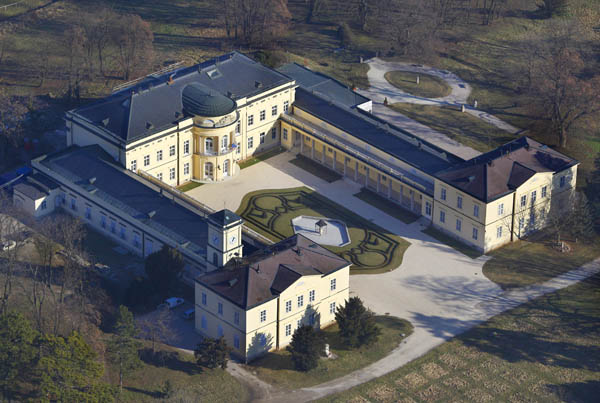
Aerial photograph of the castle, January 2011

The first owner of the Fehérvárcsurgó estate was the Hochburg family from 1691, then the Berényi family inherited it through marriage with a Hochburg daughter, and later the Perényi family. According to records, the baroque castle of Baron Ignác Perényi stood on the site of the present castle before 1786. In 1834, the estate was mortgaged by Imre Perényi to Count György Károlyi, who in 1825 was one of the founding members of the Hungarian Academy of Sciences by offering 40,000 forints at the reform parliament.

In 1853, the land was officially purchased by the Károlyi family. The castle was built between 1844 and 1851, construction coinciding with Károlyi's marriage to Countess Karolina Zichy, according to the plans of Henrich Koch, who also rebuilt the Károlyi Palace in Pest in the English classicist style. The architect, who lived in Vienna, was represented by Miklós Ybl, who, as the architect of the Károlyi family, participated in the planning related to the artistic direction. The castle was built with a central projection and a tympanum. A 30-meter-high tower rises on the side of the castle, with a small turret at each of the four corners, with a balustrade between them. A French garden was created in the castle courtyard.

After Károlyi's death in 1877, the castle was inherited by his second son, Viktor. By 1888, the castle was owned by Gyula Károlyi, the organizer and first president of the Hungarian Red Cross Society. His eldest son was the politician Mihály Károlyi, and his younger son was József Károlyi, who was the grandfather of the current trustee, György Károlyi. József Károlyi, the Lord Governor of Fejér County and Székesfehérvár, and a member of parliament, is responsible for the eclectic, baroque transformation of the façade of the building facing the courtyard around 1910, which changed the overall effect of the façade with the curved elliptical extension planned in the middle of the U shape. At that time, the library room was added to the middle part. The last owner of the manor was István Károlyi, who was the founder and owner of the Madách Theater in Budapest during World War II.

=== Post World War II ===
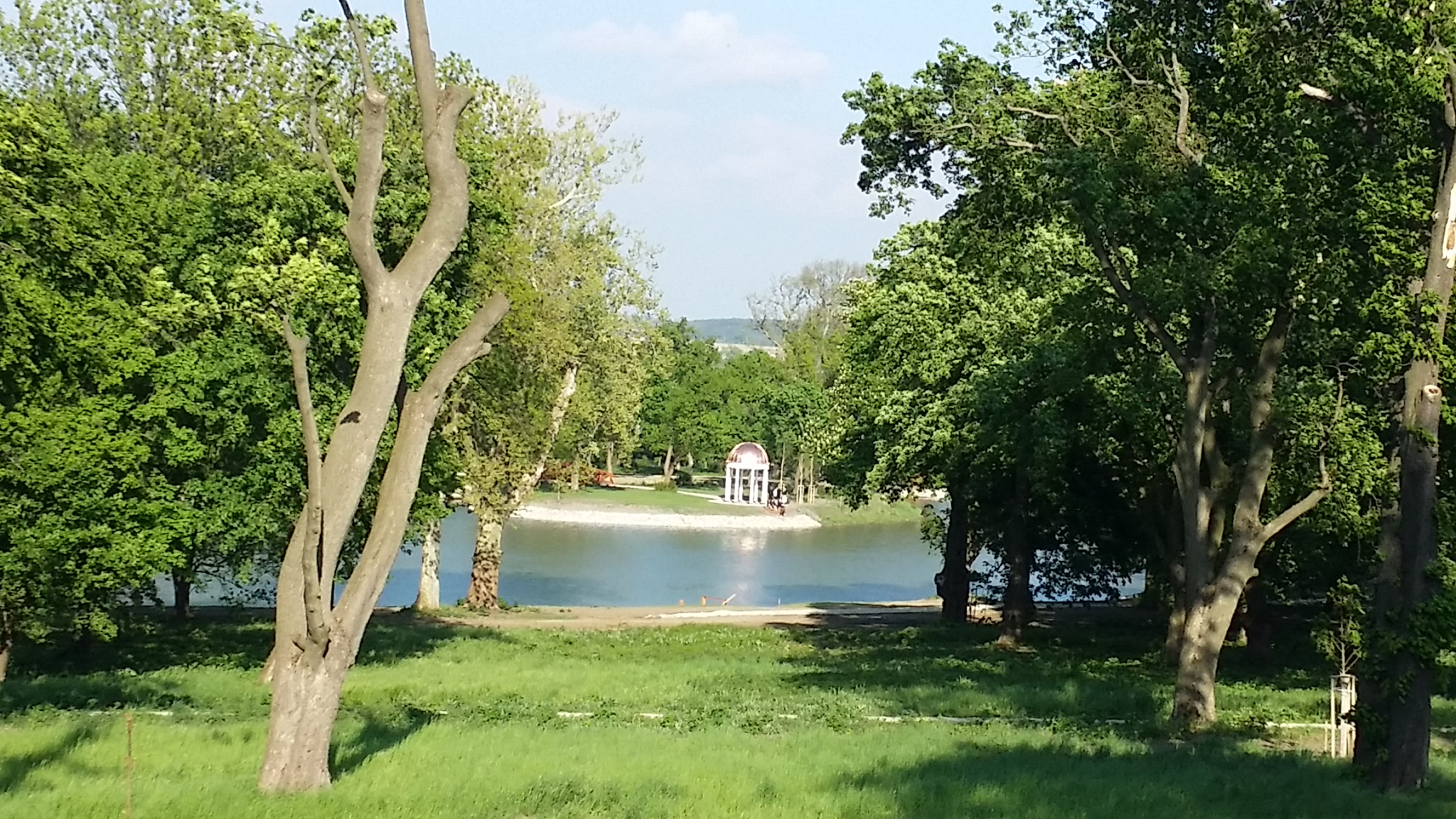
The Castle park

After World War II, the castle and the estate were taken from the Károlyi family and nationalized without compensation. From 1946, it was used as a holiday resort by the Budapest Gas Works (Hungarian: Fővárosi Gázmúvek). In 1949, it was designated as a refugee home for Greek children. It then operated as a state foster home until the 1980s. It was evacuated in 1979 due to its deteriorated condition. In 1995, the castle came under the management of the State Conservancy of Monuments (MÁG). In 1997, the Károlyi József Foundation, established by György Károlyi, who lives in Paris, and MÁG signed a cooperation agreement for the joint renovation and utilization of the castle. Currently, the cultural meeting center operating in the castle is a member of the European Network of Cultural Meeting Centers. In order to supplement and "maintain" the cultural functions, the castle aims to integrate into tourism flows with the help of hotel and catering departments. This plan was awarded the UNESCO World Heritage Decade emblem in 1995. In parallel with the foundation's scientific and cultural activities, the Károlyi Castle Development and Operation Co. Ltd. is continuously renovating the castle.

The castle is open to visitors all year round, and permanent and temporary exhibitions can be viewed and participated in. Permanent programs include an international conference on a variety of topics to be held in March. In addition to Hungarian speakers, international experts on the subject will also speak. In the spring, the European Ornamental Plant and Horticultural Days are held, where you can meet representatives of Hungarian horticulture and learn about the horticulture of European countries. The September program is the Quartettissimo European String Quartet Festival, where you can listen to performances by Hungarian and foreign string quartets. The candlelight concert held once a year in summer and winter is also very popular.

Before his death, Ferenc Fejtő, a writer living in France, donated his library of several thousand volumes, including his own works, to the Károlyi Castle in Fehérvárcsurgó.

The castle houses the book legacy of Szabolcs Vajay, a renowned historian and researcher of genealogy and heraldry. In addition to basic documents on Hungarian and European family history, archival materials (correspondence, notes, manuscripts, etc.) can be found in the castle's honorary library.

== Gallery ==
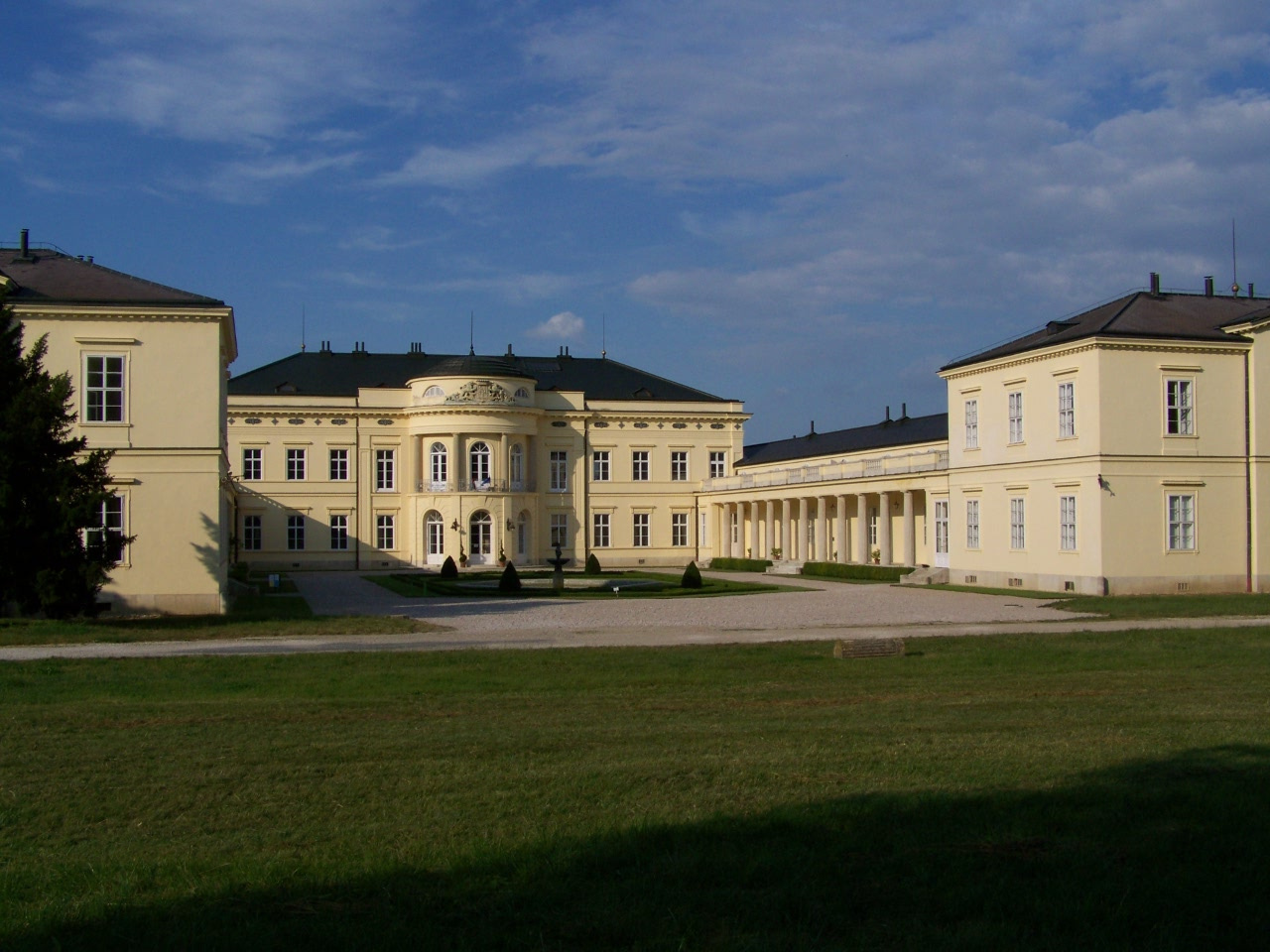
The castle viewed from the park, January 2007

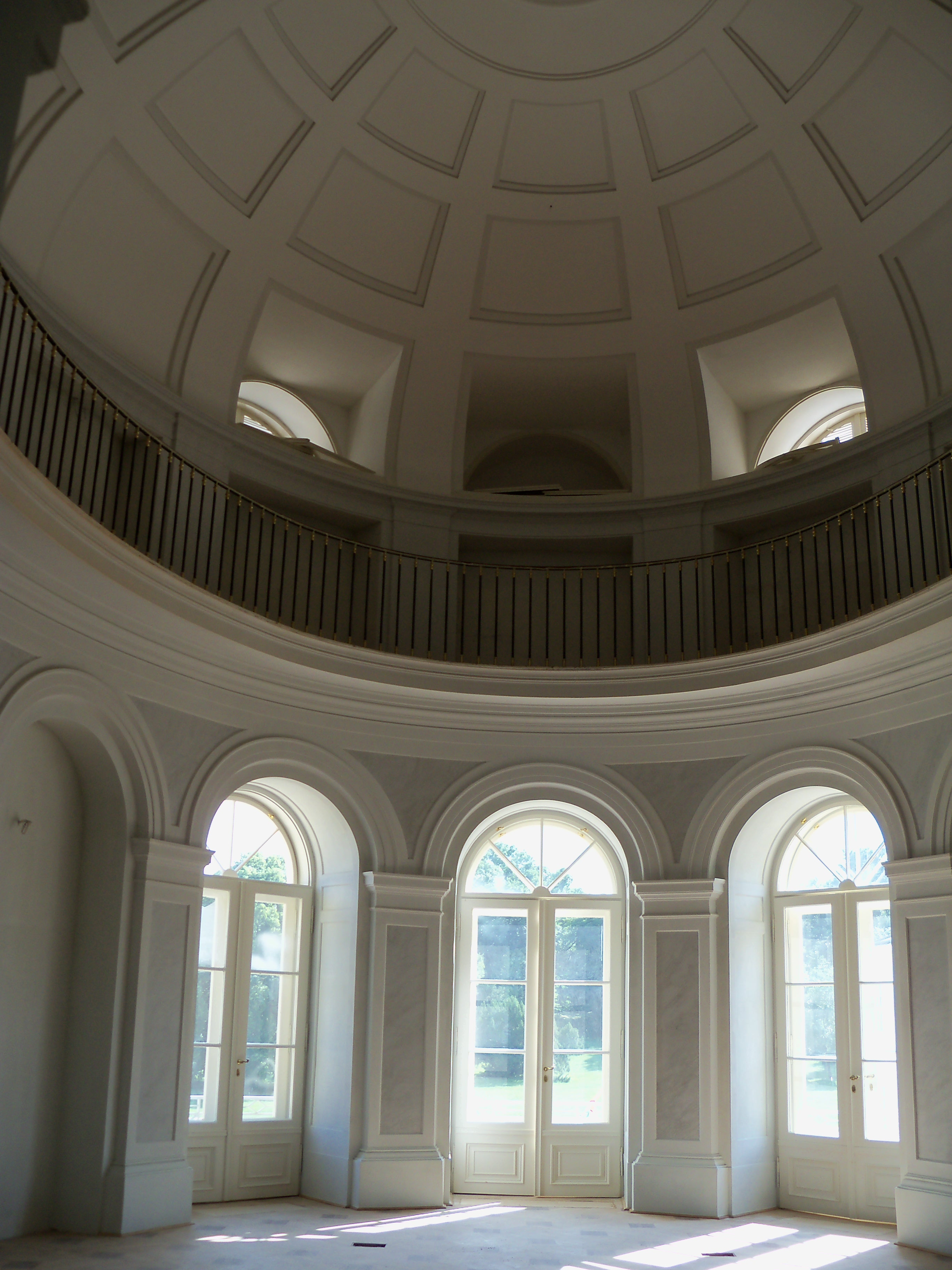
A detail of the castle's interior, June 2011

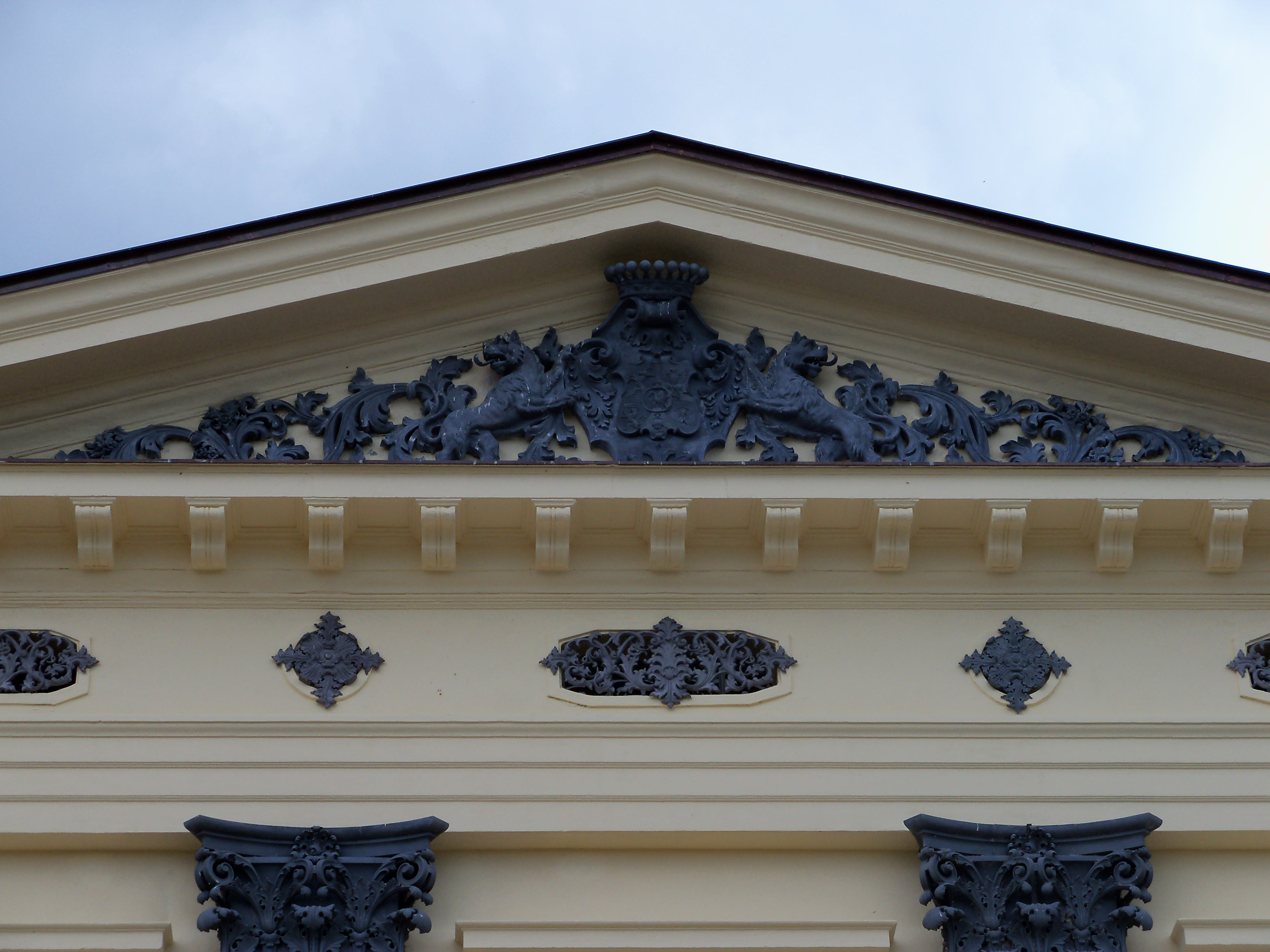
June 2011

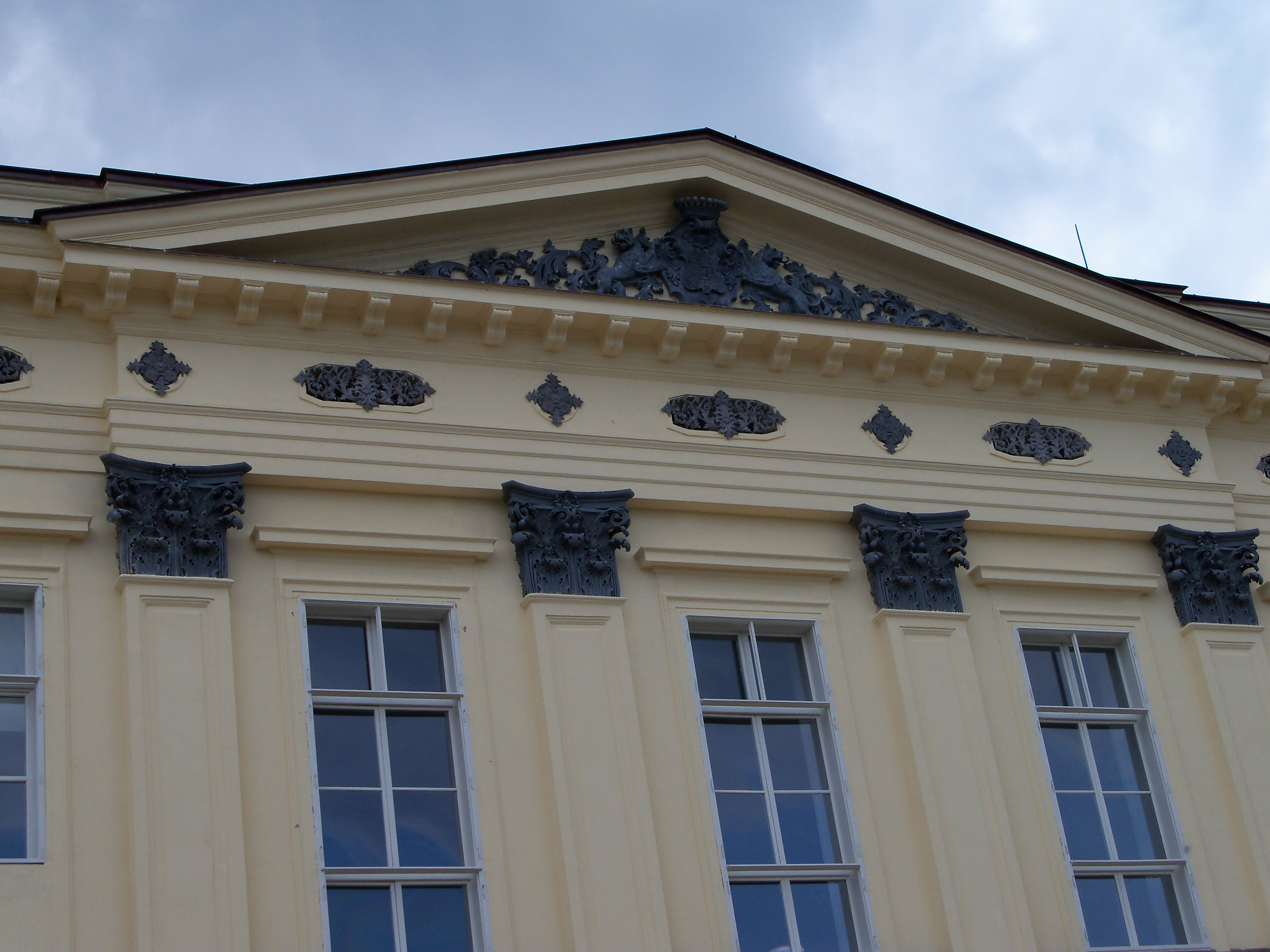
June 2011

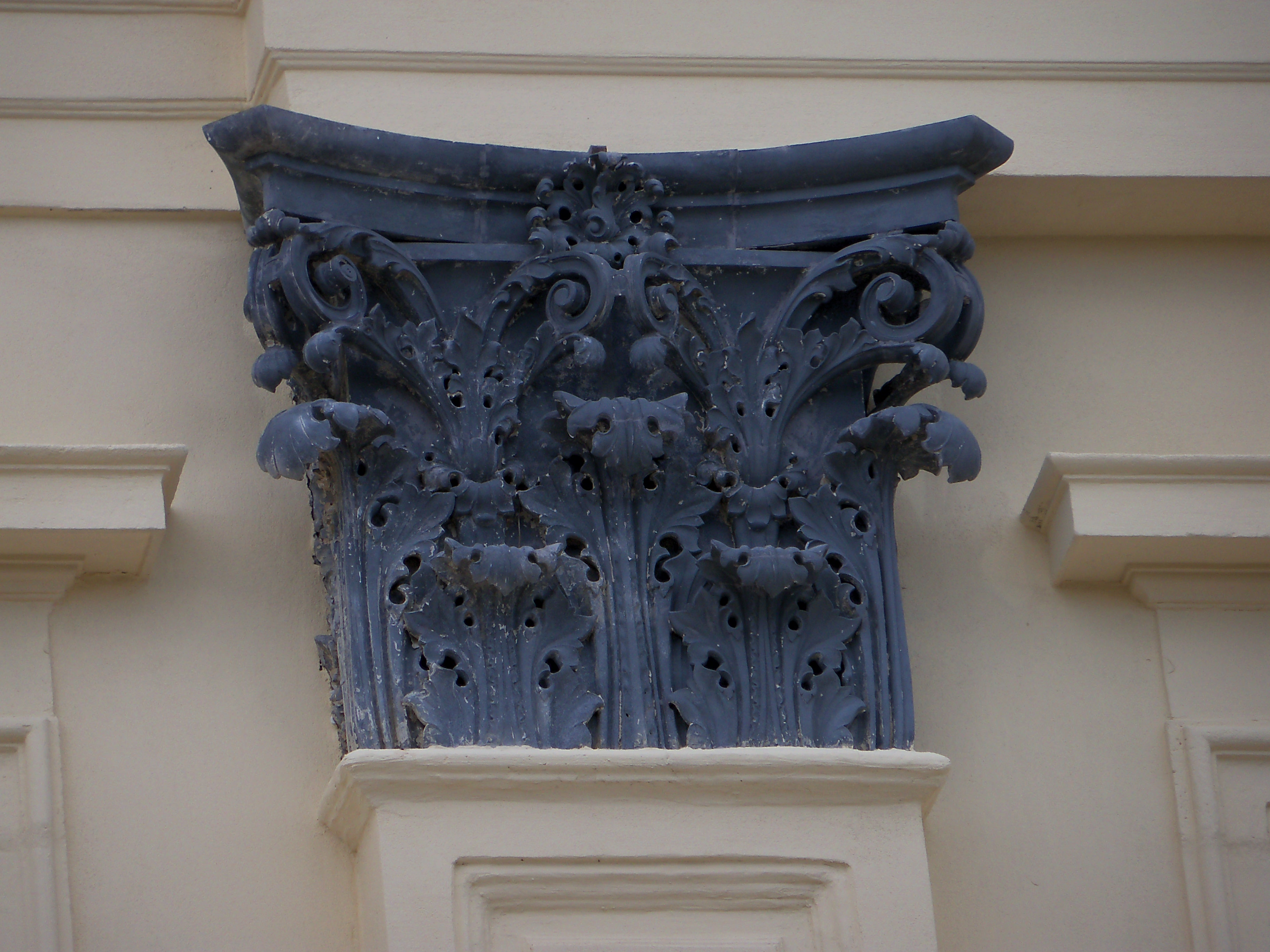
June 2011

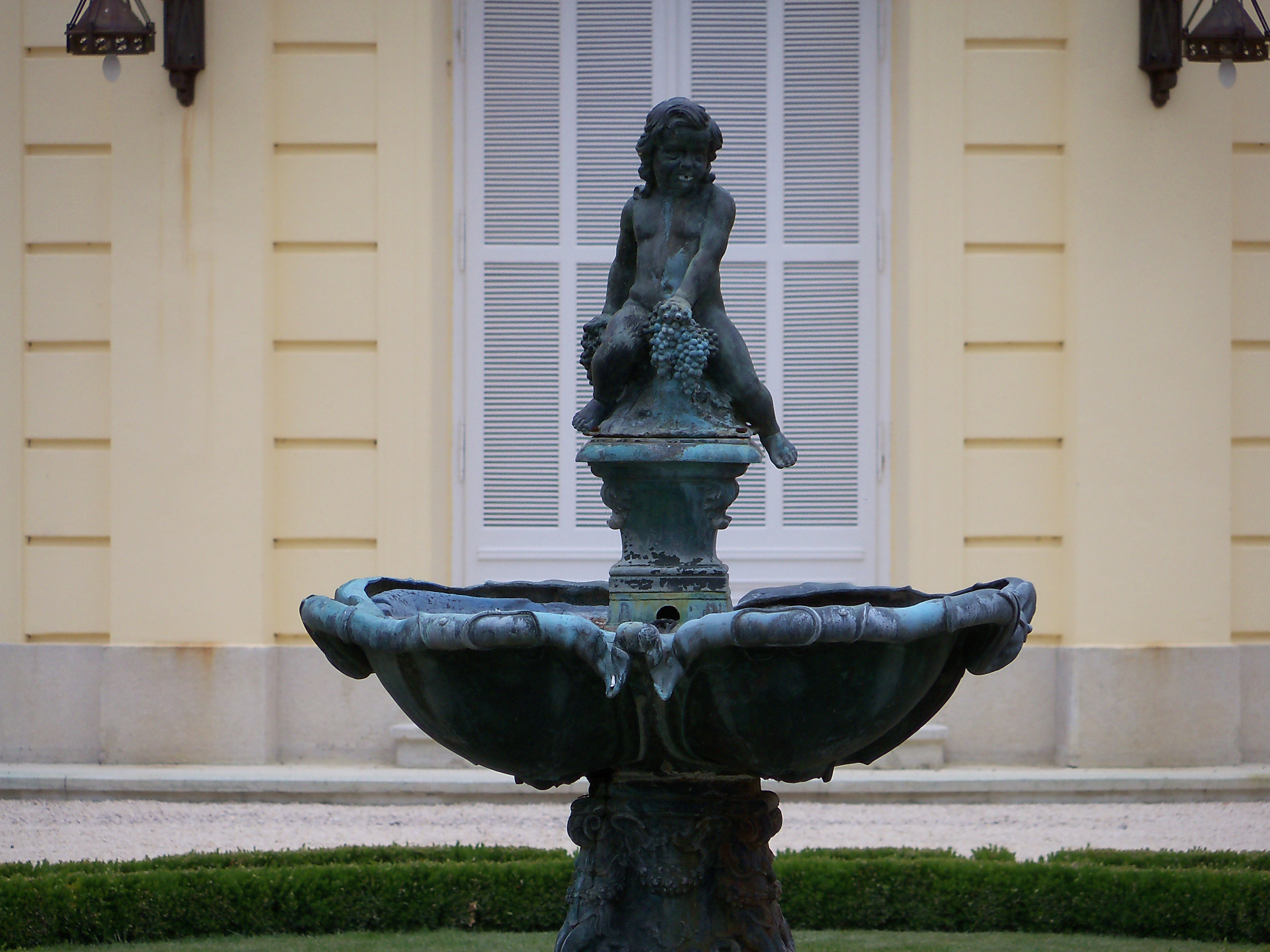
June 2011
