= Károlyi Castle (Beregsurány) =

19th-century castle in Beregsurány, Szabolcs-Szatmár-Bereg County, Hungary

- Károlyi-kastély
- Beregsurány, Vásárosnamény District, Szabolcs-Szatmár-Bereg County, Hungary
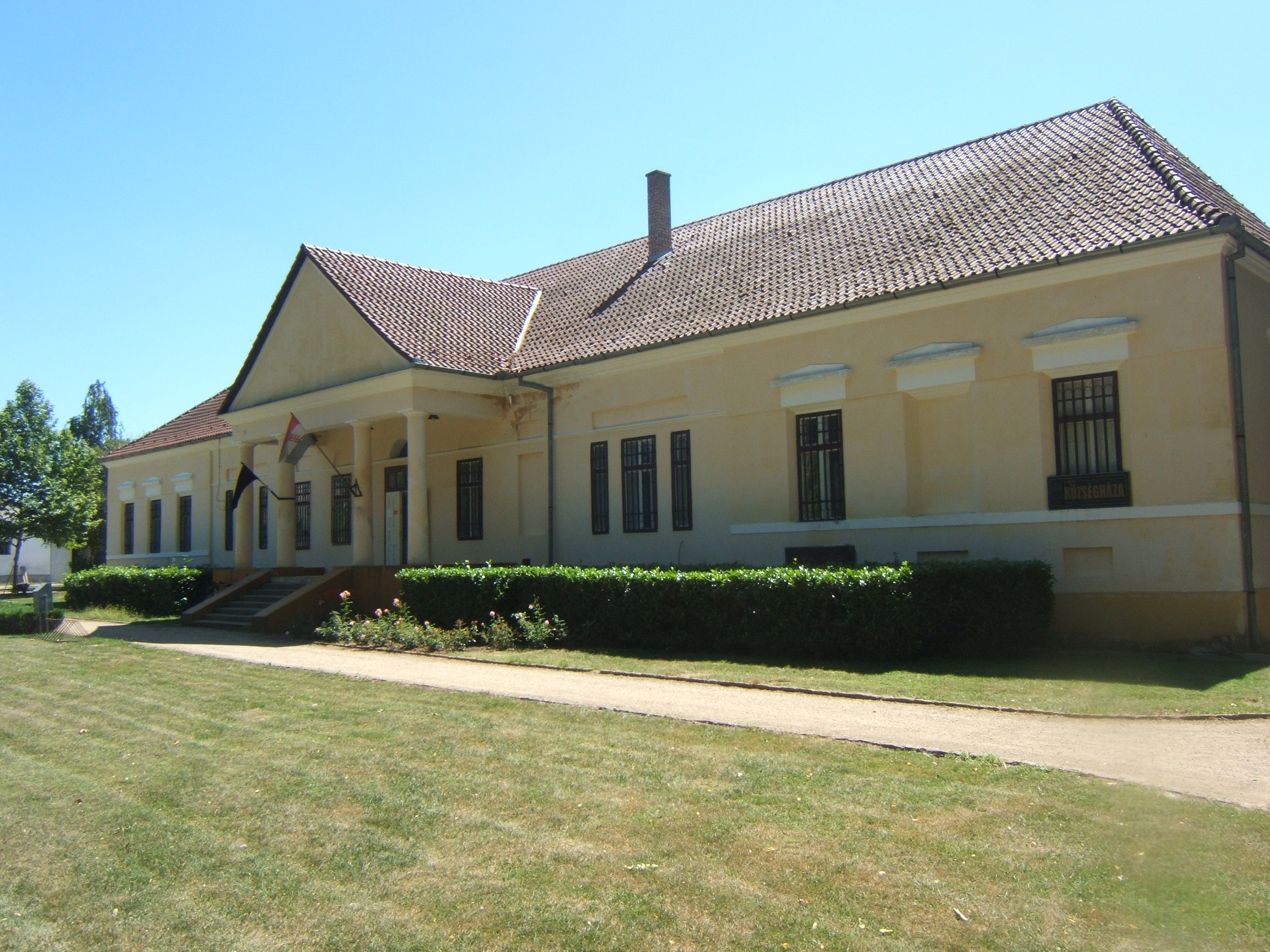
- The Castle, July 2013

Site information
- Type: Castle
- Owner: Government of Beregsurány

Location
- Location of Károlyi Castle in Hungary
- Coordinates: 48°09′44″N 22°33′08″E

Site history
- Built for: Gyula Uray
- Architect: Miklós Ybl

Károlyi Castle (also called Uray Castle) is a 19th-century castle located in Beregsurány, Vásárosnamény District, Szabolcs-Szatmár-Bereg County, Hungary. The castle was built in classicist style by Baron Gyula Uray before being acquired by the Károlyi family and updated by architect Miklós Ybl.

== History ==
It was built by Baron Gyula Uray at the beginning of the 19th century, in the classicist style. On the street and courtyard façades of the ground-floor building, the four-columned colonnade is closed by a triangular pediment. It is simple in design, with romantic details, both on the outside and inside. It is owned by the local government, and currently houses the mayor's office.

=== The castle park ===
In the castle park, called the Baron's Garden, there is a World War II memorial, a millennium memorial column, and rare species of trees (holm oak, noble linden, plane tree).
