= Károlyi Castle (Parádfürdő) =

Castle in Parád, Hungary

- Károlyi-kastély
- Parád, Pétervására District, Heves County, Hungary
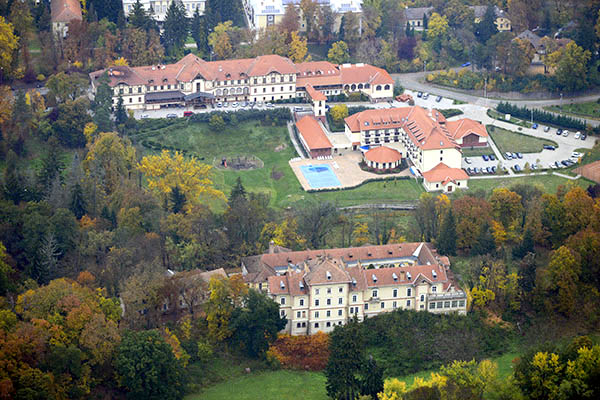
- The Castle, October 2015

Site information
- Type: Castle

Location
- Location of Károlyi Castle in Hungary
- Coordinates: 47°55′45.21″N 20°03′26.15″E

Site history
- Architect: Miklós Ybl

Károlyi Castle is a 19th-century castle located in Parád, Pétervására District, Heves County, Hungary. The castle was remodeled and expanded in classicist for the Károlyi family by architect Miklós Ybl in 1872.

== History ==
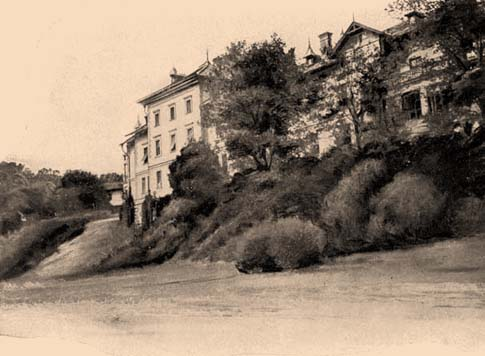
Károlyi Castle, c. 1909, when owned by Prime Minister Count Mihály Károlyi

The center of Parádfürdő is occupied by a large park, which was once the garden of the nearby castle. On the right bank of the Tarna River, on top of a high hill, the former castle of the Károlyi family still stands today.

In the 18th century, there was only a summer residence here, owned by several families, including the Rákóczi and Grassalkovich families. The Károlyi family rented the estate before buying it in 1847, which György Károlyi had rebuilt into a hunting lodge in 1872 with Miklós Ybl. In 1889, Gyula Károlyi added a two-story, romantic wing to the classicist-style building, which turned it into a 44-room castle complete with a piped water system. In 1914, future Prime Minister Count Mihály Károlyi and his wife, Katinka Andrássy, spent their honeymoon here.

=== Current use ===
After 1918–1919, the confiscated manor building was used as a hotel. In 1927, the estate became state property of Hungary and the National Cultural Foundation was established. From 1949 to 1988, after a restoration, the castle was operated as a children's resort of the National Council of Trade Unions. Then it was used as a Home for the Elderly, maintained by the Heves County Municipality, which moved within its walls, and in 1996 the building was purchased by the Heves County Municipality from the SZOT property. The Home for the Elderly moved to a new building in 2008 and has been empty since then.
