= Károlyi Castle (Parádsasvár) =

Castle in Fehérvárcsurgó, Hungary

- Károlyi-kastély
- Fehérvárcsurgó, Pétervására District, Heves County, Hungary
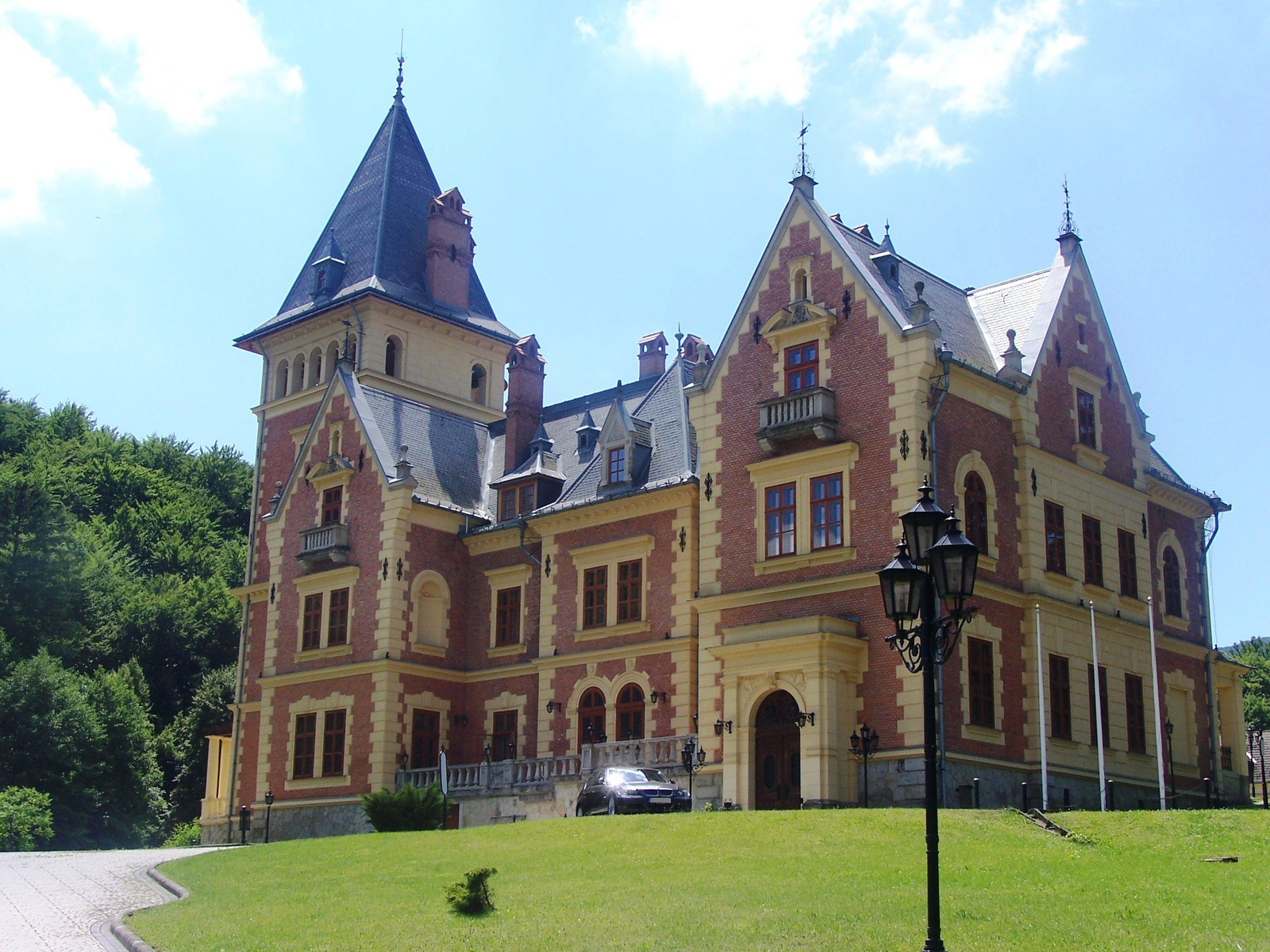
- The Castle, July 2010

Site information
- Type: Castle

Location
- Location of Károlyi Castle in Hungary
- Coordinates: 47°55′01″N 19°58′59″E

Site history
- Built: 1881–1882
- Built for: Károlyi family
- Architect: Miklós Ybl

Károlyi Castle is a 19th-century castle located in Fehérvárcsurgó, Pétervására District, Heves County, Hungary. The castle was built in classicist and eclectic style by Count Gyula Károlyi, a descendant of the Károlyi family, and was designed by architect Miklós Ybl.

== History ==
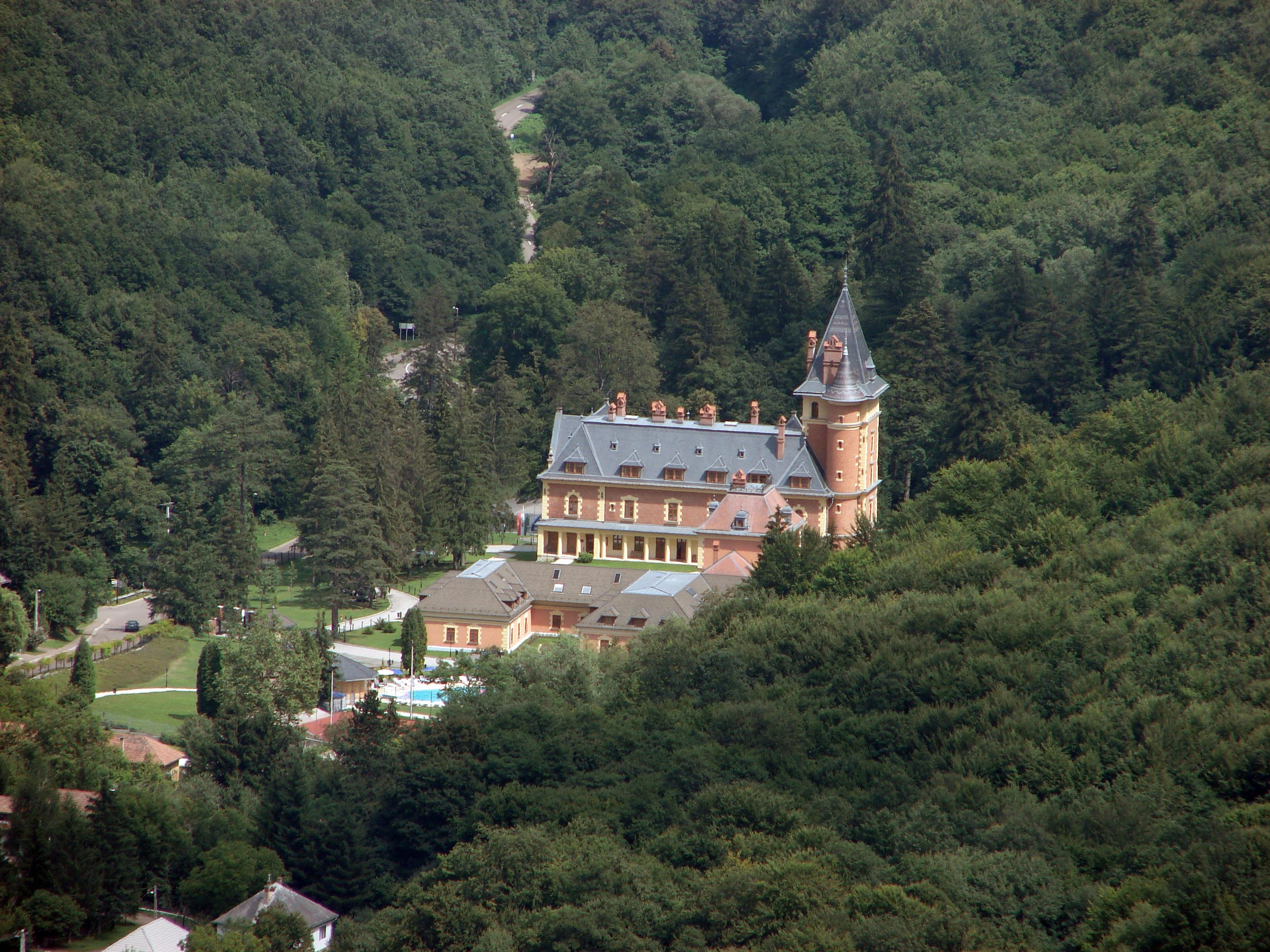
Aerial view of the castle

Fehérvárcsurgó was first mentioned in 1549, as the property of Kristóf Országh. The next owner was Eger Castle captain Baron Christoph von Ungnad, who mortgaged the area in 1575. It was bought by Baron Sigismund Rákóczi, Prince of Transylvania, in 1603, who owned it for nearly 100 years. In 1676, part of Parádsasvár came to Francis II Rákóczi, Ruling Prince of Hungary, and his sister, Júlia Rákóczi. In the 1740s, Count Antal Grassalkovich acquired the property right who in 1770 installed the Parád glass huta in Parádsasvár, from which a glass factory was established.

In c. 1841, former tenant, Count György Károlyi acquired ownership. His son Count Gyula Károlyi built the Károlyi Castle in 1881 based on designs by the Károlyi family architect Miklós Ybl, as a gift for his wife, Countess Karolin Zichy. The castle was completed in 1882, however, the Countess was living in exile with Lajos Kossuth at the time, so she was only able to move into the castle in 1893. The castle was inherited by their grandson, Count Mihály Károlyi (Prime Minister of Hungary and then the 1st President of Hungary). While Count Mihály preferred the city, his wife, Katinka Andrássy, enjoyed spending time at the castle. They rented out part of the castle to tenants, who used the rooms as a hotel.

=== Nationalization and conversion ===
After the fall of the Hungarian Soviet Republic in 1919, the area came into state hands, and the Károlyis only got it back at the end of World War II. They enjoyed the estate for two years, before it was nationalized as state property again. The government used it as a children's holiday resort. After years of neglect, the castle deteriorated so much that the holiday resort was closed, and it sat in a state of disrepair for years. In 1996, however, the dilapidated, completely gutted castle, stripped of its windows, doors and decorations, was fully renovated. Two years later, it opened its doors as a five-star hotel in December 1998, which continues to operate today Parádsasvár became an independent municipality in 1947.

== Gallery ==
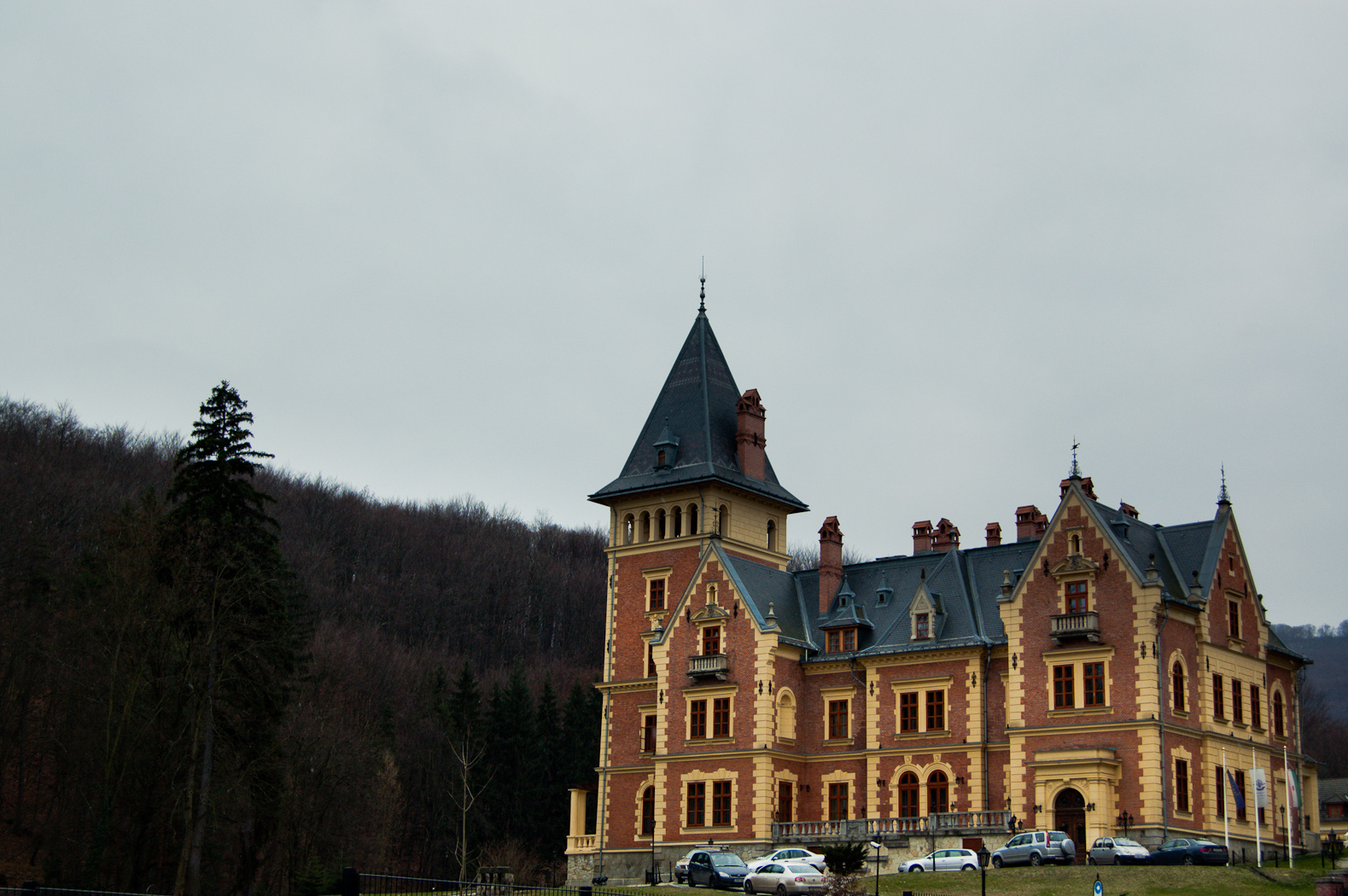
December 2009

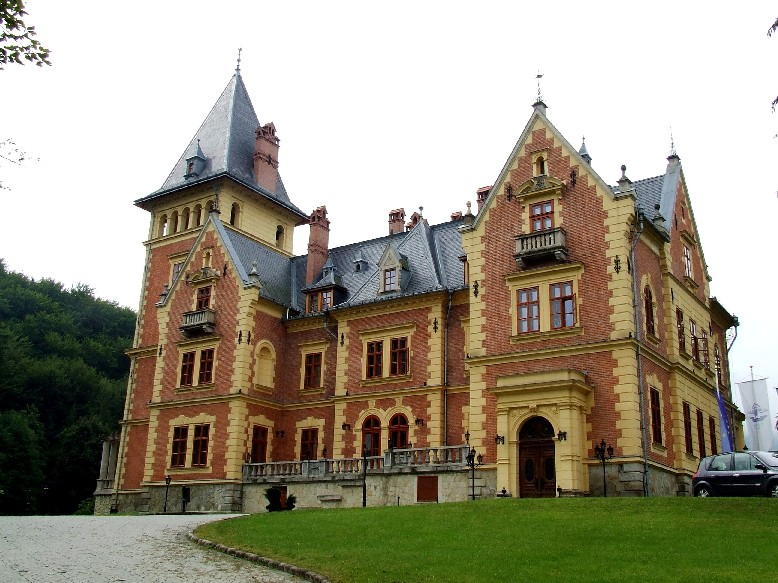
2000s

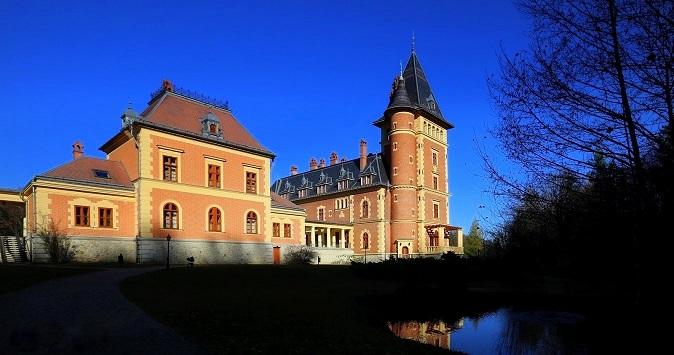
The hotel, November 2018
