= Berényi =

Berényi or Berény may refer to:

== People with the surname ==
- Dénes Berényi (1928–2012), Hungarian nuclear physicist
- Ferenc Berényi (1927–2004), Hungarian painter
- László Berényi (born 1961), Hungarian politician
- Maria Berényi (born 1959), Romanian Hungarian historian and poet
- Miki Berenyi (born 1967), British musician, singer and guitarist for Lush
- József Berényi (born 1967), ethnic Hungarian politician in Slovakia
- Róbert Berény (1887 – 1953), Hungarian painter
- Charlotte Wiehe-Berény (1865 – 1947), Danish actor, dancer, and singer

== Other uses ==
- 5694 Berényi, a minor planet named after Dénes Berényi
- Beriu (Hungarian: Berény), a commune in Hunedoara County, Transylvania, Romania
