= Károlyi Castle (Fót) =

Former castle in Pest County, Hungary

- Károlyi-kastély
- Fót, Dunakeszi District, Pest County, Hungary
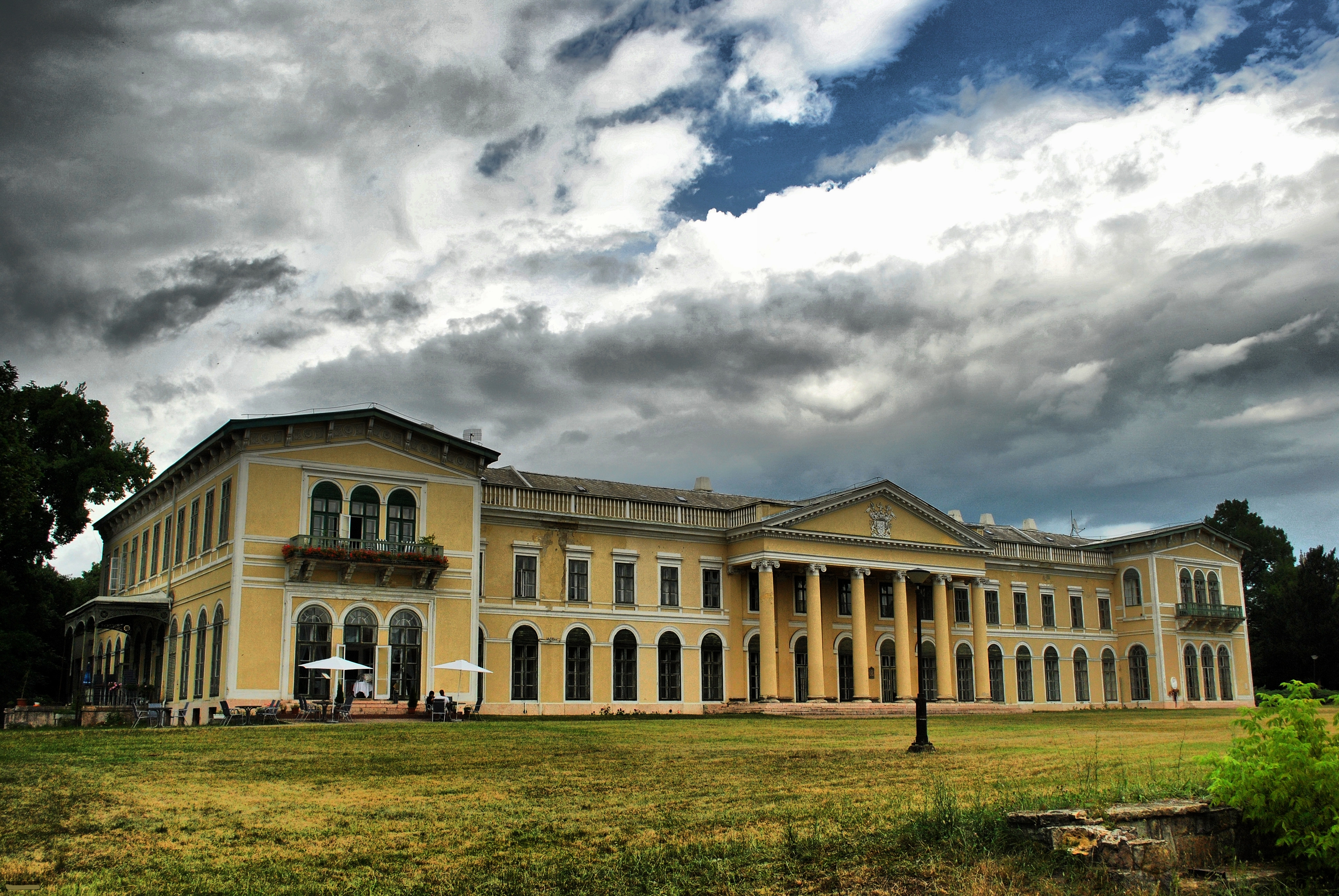
- The Castle, September 2011

Site information
- Type: Castle
- Owner: Government of Hungary

Location
- Location of Károlyi Castle in Hungary
- Coordinates: 47°36′25.99″N 19°11′41.9″E

Site history
- Built: 18th century
- Built for: János Fekete de Galántha (18th century); Károlyi family (19th century)
- Architect: Miklós Ybl
- In use: Orphanage, Waldorf school, vocational high school, restaurant

Károlyi Castle is a former castle located in the city of Fót, Dunakeszi District, Pest County, Hungary with a large park and numerous outbuildings.

== History ==
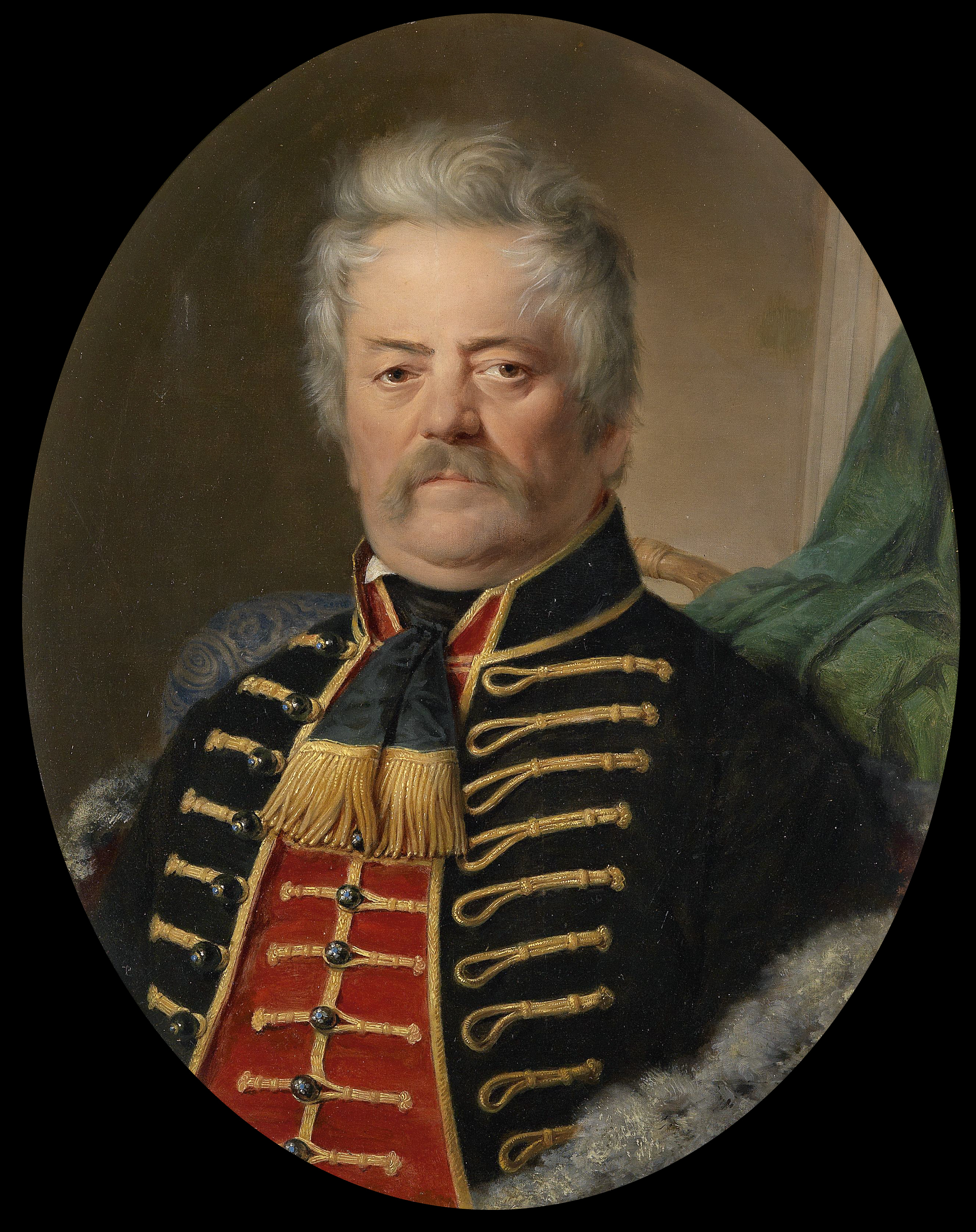
Portrait of Count István Károlyi, by Friedrich Lieder, 1853

The castle was originally built in the 18th century as a single-story, castle-like building, for Count János Fekete de Galántha. In 1808, after the family line ended, the Károlyi family bought the former Fekete estate. At the beginning of the 19th century, a floor was added and a small chapel was built, and minor alterations were made around the 1820s and 1830s.

After Count István Károlyi met Miklós Ybl, who was still little known at the time, he invited him to his estate to prepare plans for him to transform the building into a castle and build a Catholic church; he later became the manor architect of the Károlyi family. During the construction work in the 1840s, the castle was updated into its current form and style based on his plans, changing its previous Baroque classicist character to a romantic style in accordance with the taste of the time. The interior spaces were also significantly transformed: a two-story library with space for twenty thousand volumes, connected by a spiral staircase, was created, the walls of the salon-like interior spaces were decorated with works by renowned painters (including Mihály Munkácsy, Károly Lotz, Antal Ligeti), and the smaller rooms were also transformed into representative decorations, with unique inlaid parquet flooring and their walls decorated with romantic, later historical paintings. A special collection of rocks placed in storage rooms next to the walls was also created.

The outdoor works also brought significant changes to the life of the park around the castle: in addition to the garden being planted with special plants and trees, a fish pond was also created.

=== Post World War II ===
In the 1940s, due to World War II, the family left the castle, which became a front-line hospital. During this time, most of the equipment disappeared, and the fate of most of it is still unknown. At the end of the 1940s, the building was occupied by the border patrol who wanted to build a training base in Socialist realist buildings. While plans for these buildings were completed, they were never built.

In November 1957, the newly established children's home received the building (Hungarian: Fóti Gyermekváros) which became (Hungarian: Károlyi István Gyermekközpont) after April 15, 1993, and its founding director, Dr. Lajos Barna, led it until 1983. During its operation, several "modern" and "Socialist realist" auxiliary buildings were built, some of which were renovated in the 2000s. In the original design, more than 300 children lived in the building, which increased to around 900 by the end of the 1960s, and then by the beginning of the 2000s, it decreased to nearly 100 people with the children living in the later built buildings. In 2019, the institution also provided facilities for a special children's home (for the chronically ill), a special children's home (for those with mental disorders), an aftercare home (for young adults), and a home for unaccompanied minors and refugees.

=== Current use ===
Around 1995, a descendant of Count István Károlyi, László Károlyi, and his wife moved back to a small part of the castle (on the floor of the left wing building, in the rooms of the former weaving workshop), which they could rent from the Hungarian state, since the laws do not allow ownership (restitution), where they created a modern version of the nobleman's ancient galleries and a small house museum of family and castle history in the foyer of the cinema hall.

Since 1996, the Fót Free Waldorf Elementary School has been renting part of the castle, where a total of about 450 children study in 13 school and 2 kindergarten groups, and since 2000, high school education has also been provided. The orphanage (and the school and high school operating next to it) was closed in 2020.

== Gallery ==
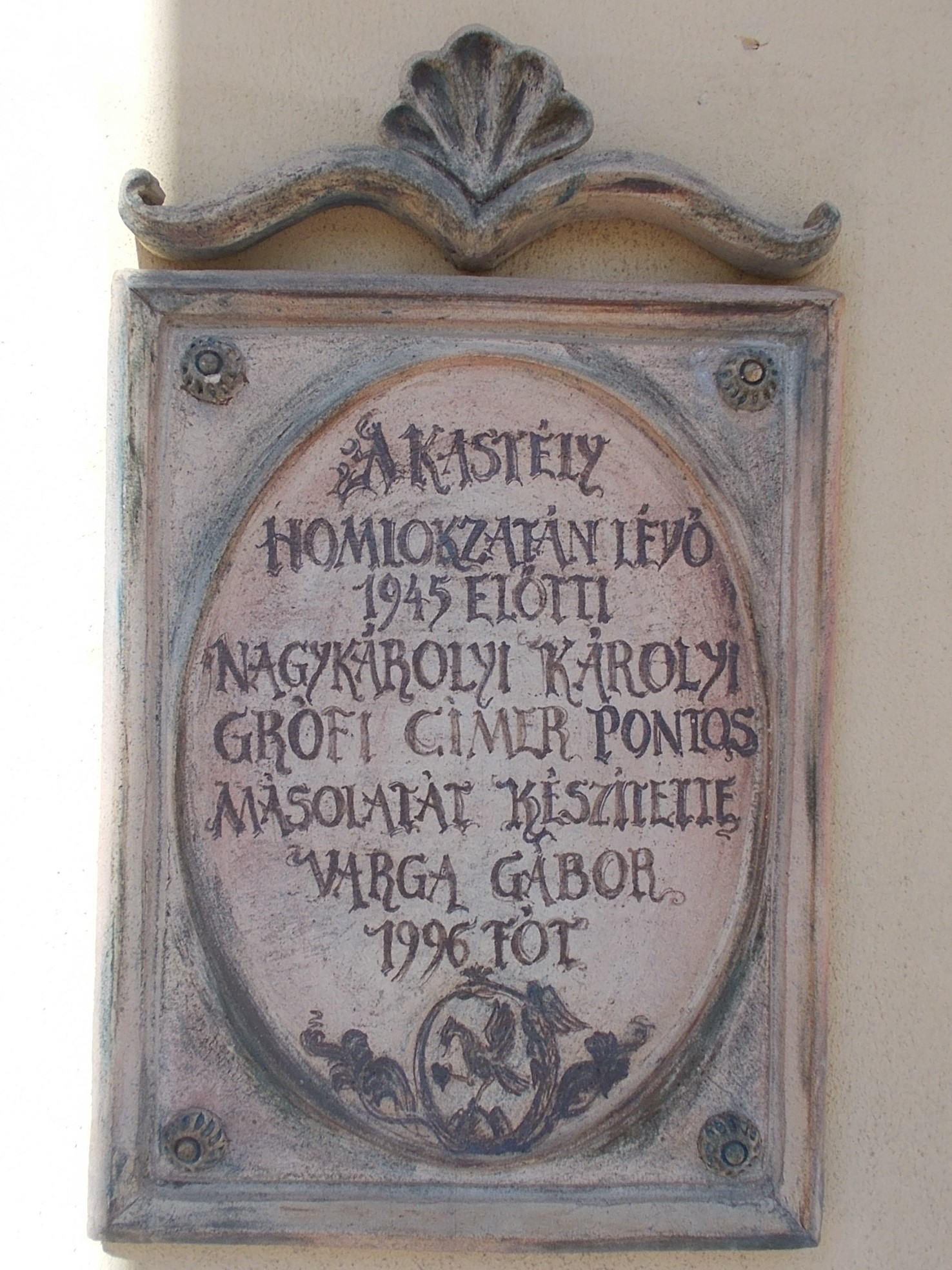
Plaque

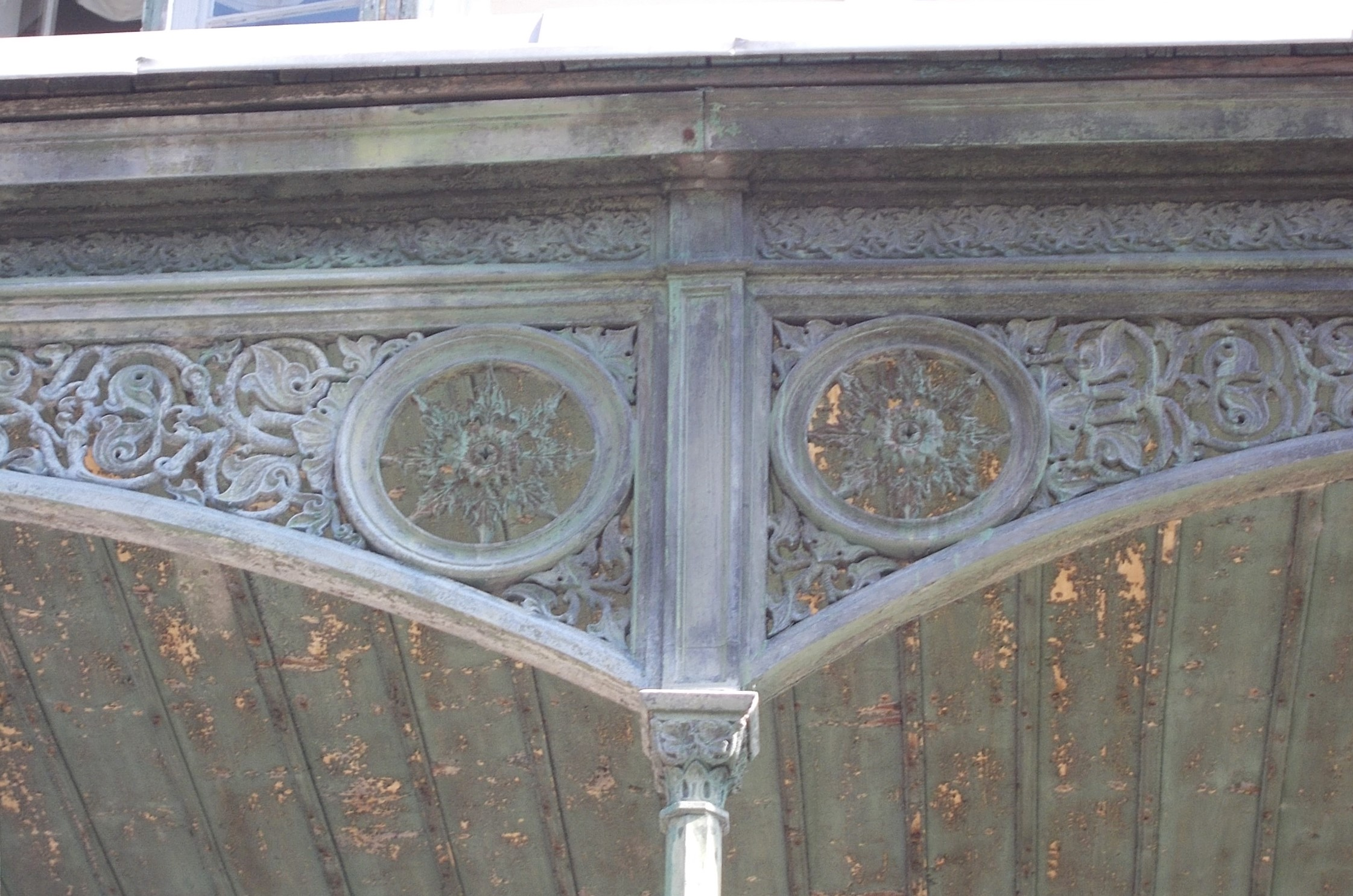
West wing detail

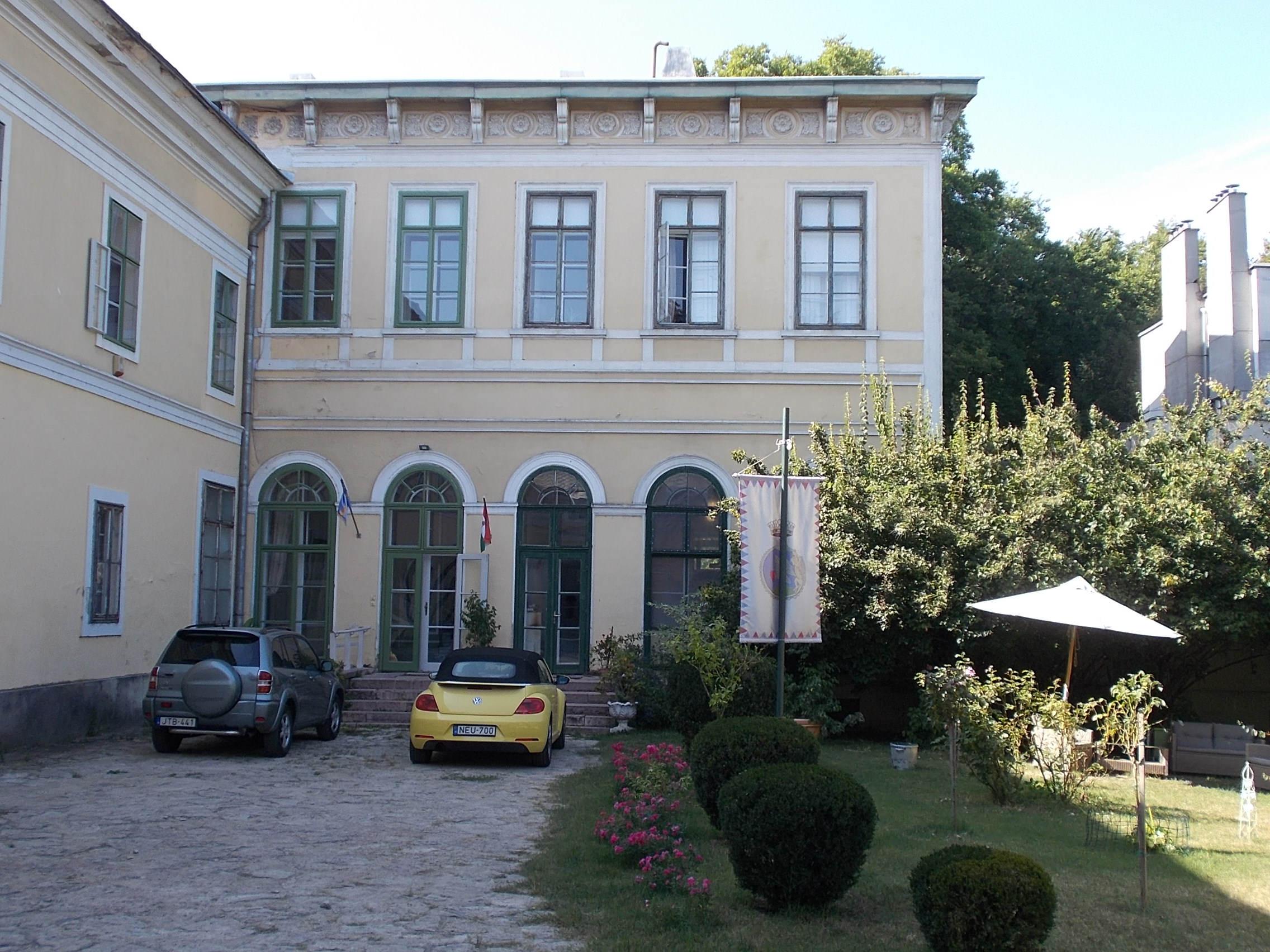
West wing

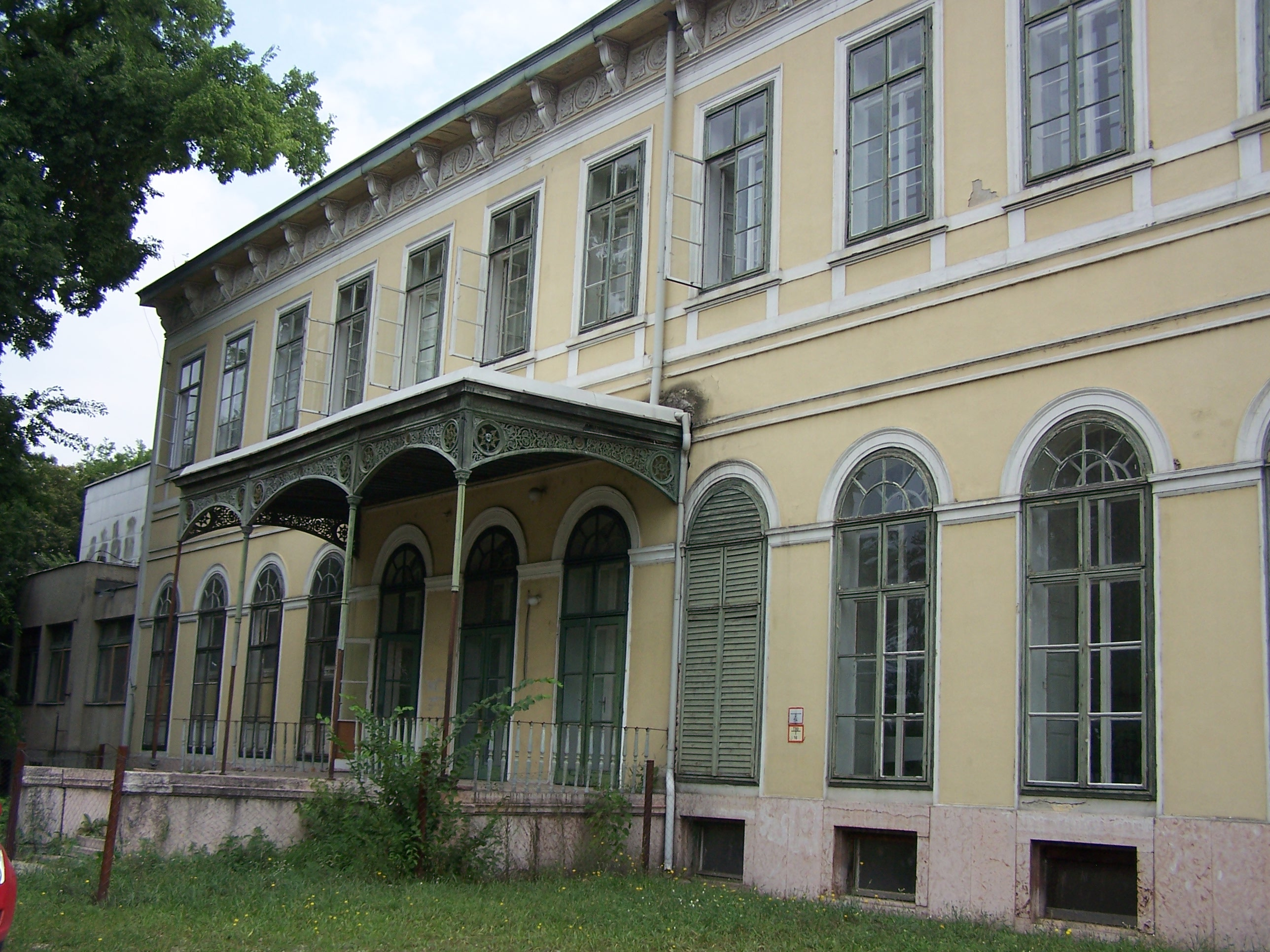

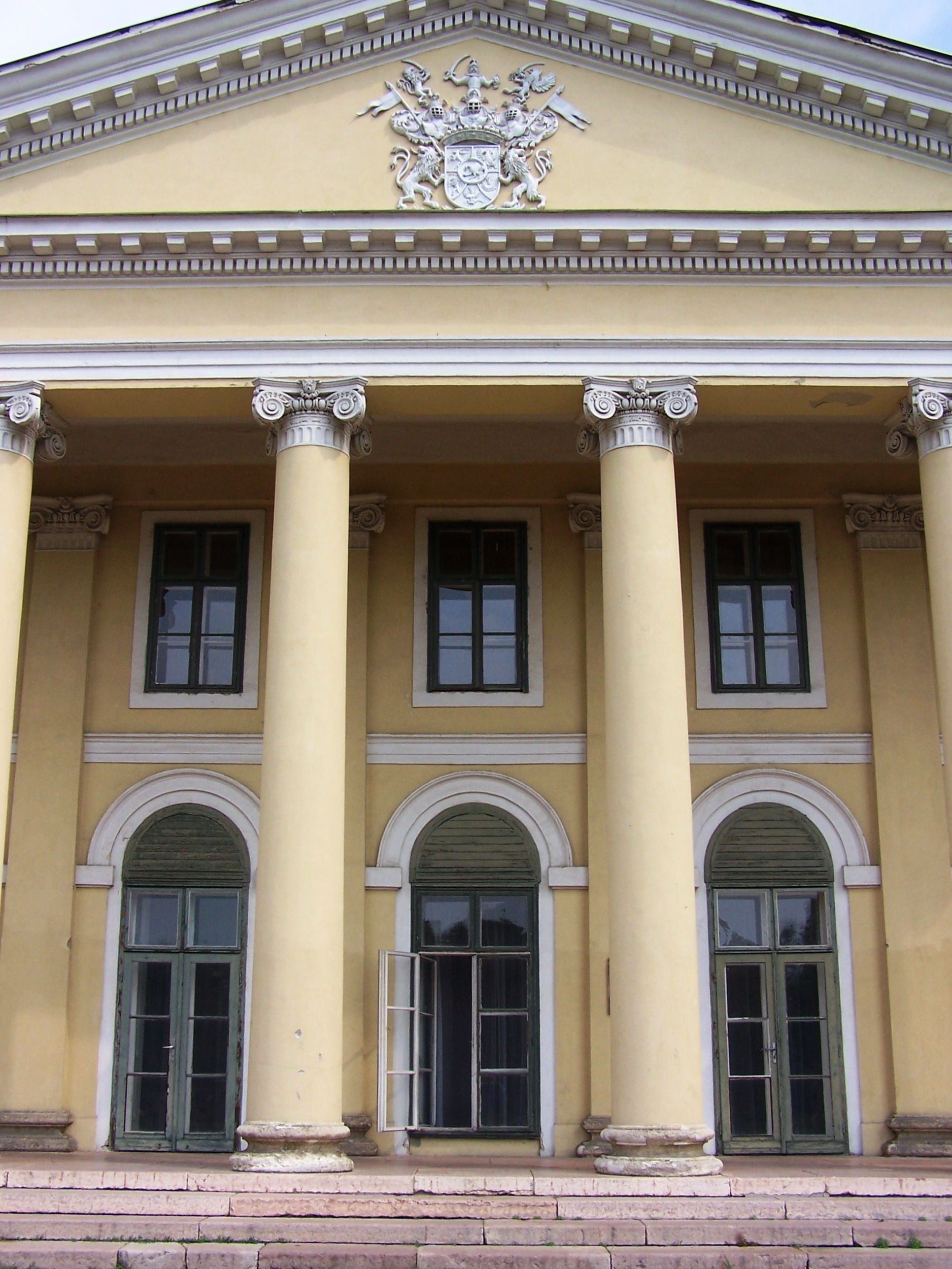
The entrance with the family coat of arms

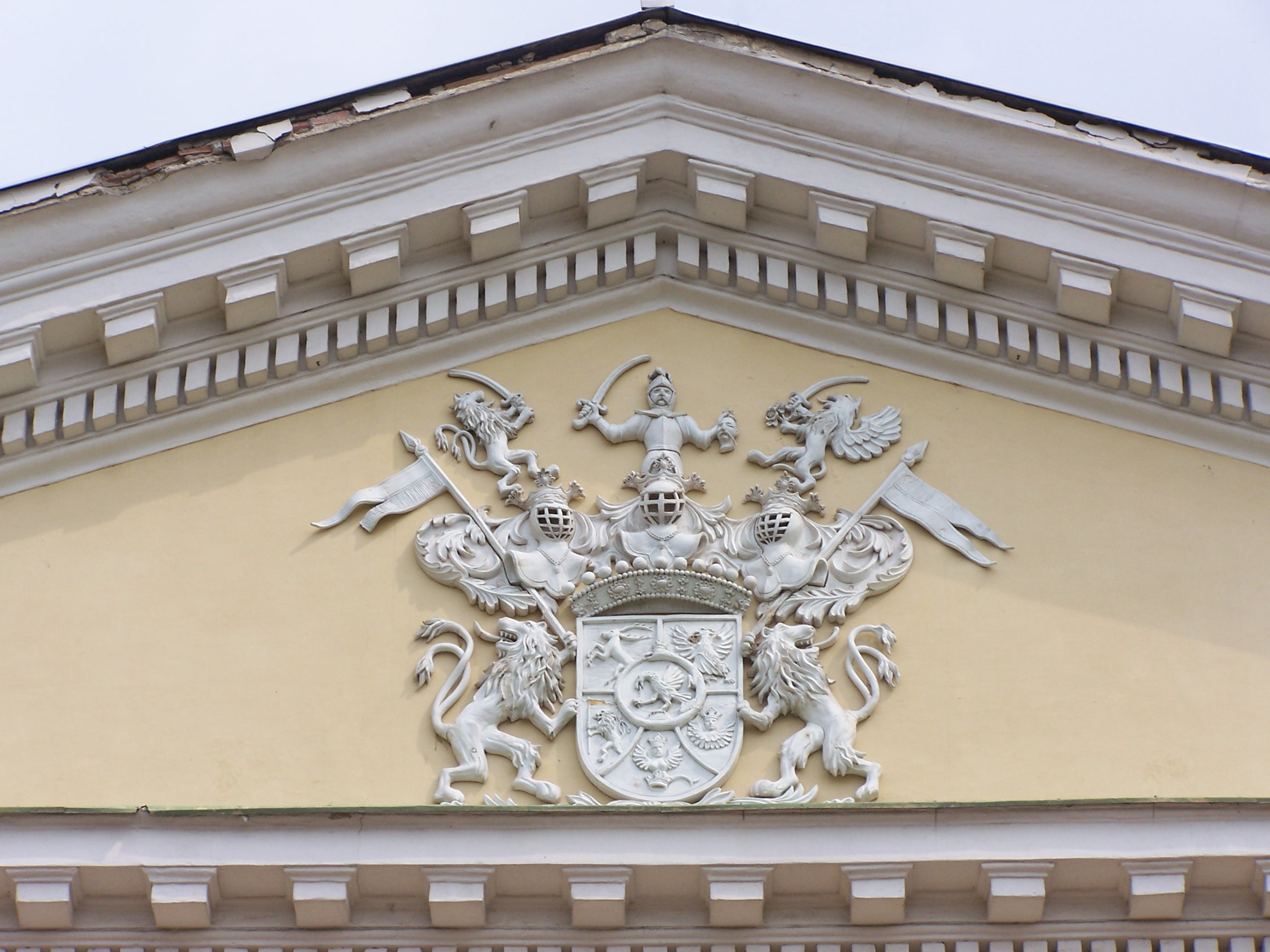
Family coat of arms
