= Dénes Berényi =

Hungarian physicist

Dénes Berényi (26 December 1928 – June 27, 2012) was a Hungarian nuclear physicist, member of the Hungarian Academy of Sciences (MTA) and Head of the Institute of Nuclear Research of the Hungarian Academy of Sciences from 1976 to 1990. The 5694 Berényi is named after him.
