= Fehérvárcsurgó =

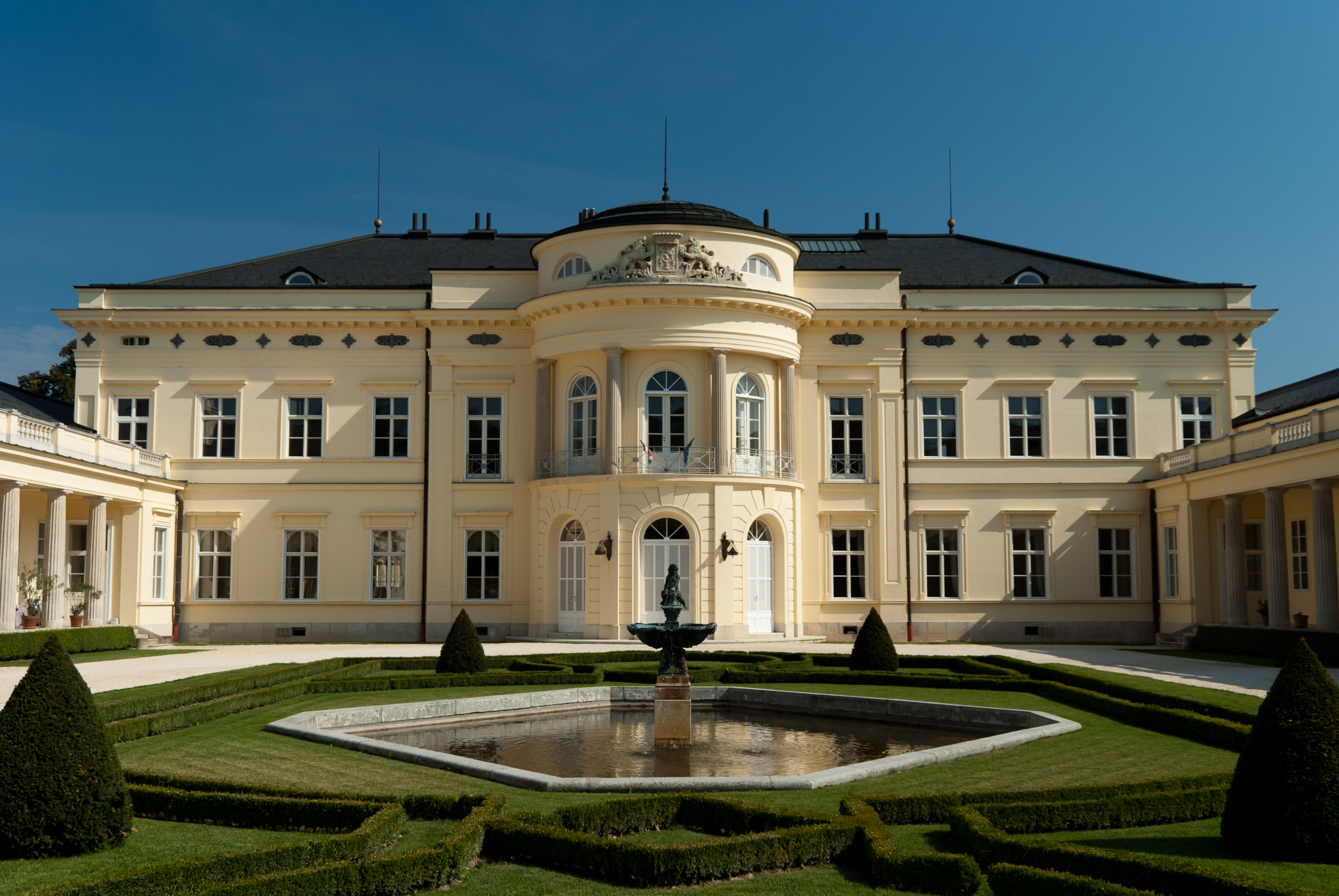
- Károlyi Castle

- Coat of arms

- Location of Fehérvárcsurgó in Hungary
- Coordinates: 47.2901°N 18.2687°E
- Country: Hungary
- Region: Central Transdanubia
- County: Fejér

Area
  - Total: 29.64 km^{2} (11.44 sq mi)

Population (2012)
  - Total: 1,971
  - Density: 66.50/km^{2} (172.2/sq mi)
- Time zone: UTC+1 (CET)
  - Summer (DST): UTC+2 (CEST)
- Postal code: 8052
- Area code: +36 22
- Website: http://fehervarcsurgo.hu/

Fehérvárcsurgó is a village in Fejér county, Hungary.

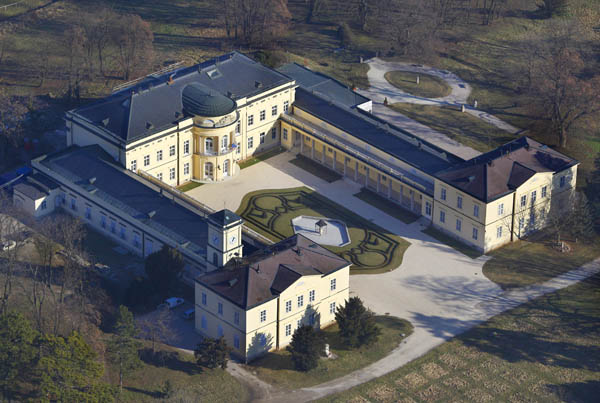
Castle
