= Miklós Ybl =

Hungarian architect

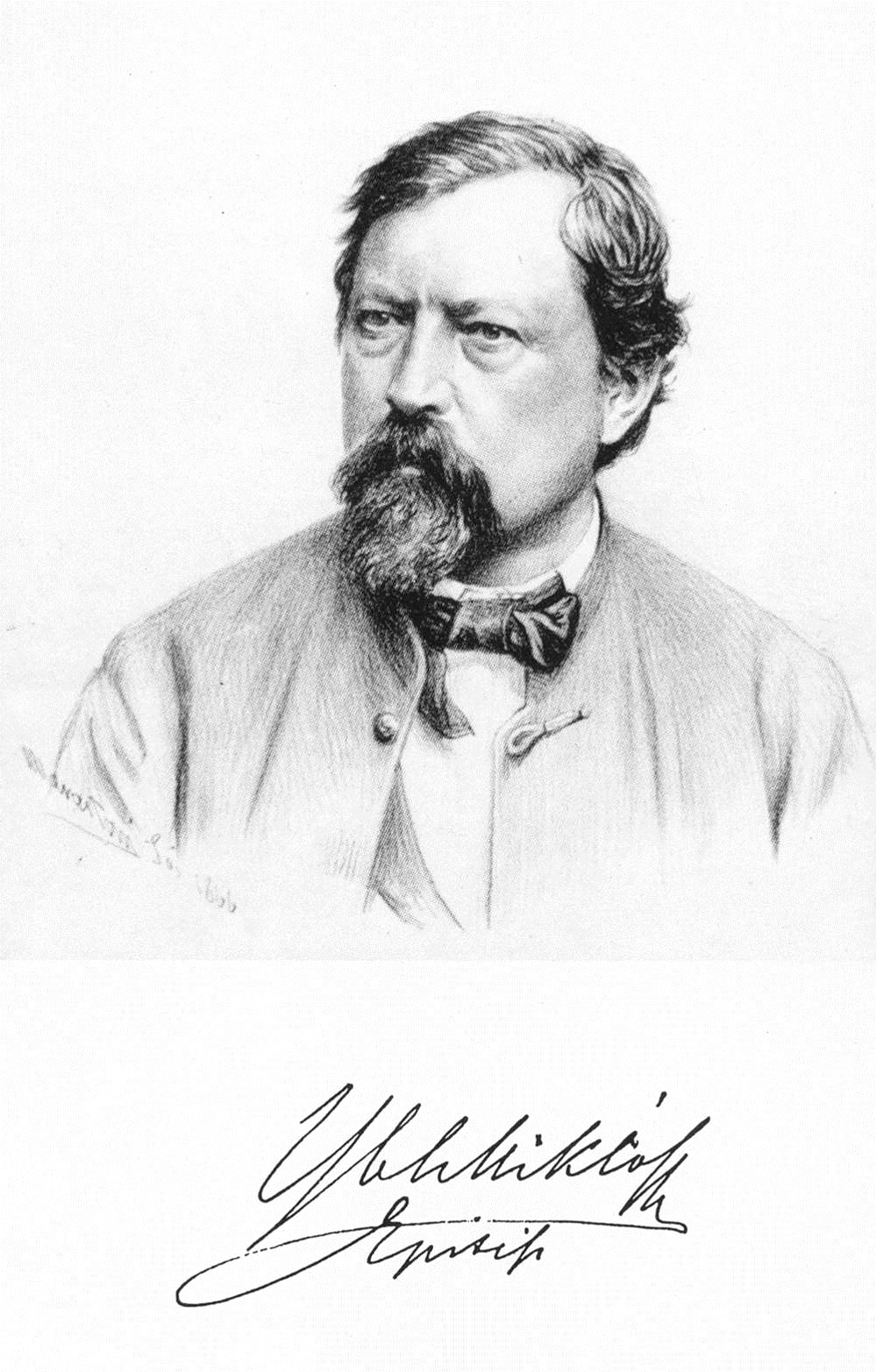
- Portrait of Ybl by Marastoni, 1866
- Born: Miklós Ybl; 6 April 1814; Székesfehérvár, Kingdom of Hungary, Austrian Empire
- Died: 22 January 1891; Budapest, Austria-Hungary
- Education: TU Wien, Vienna; Munich Academy, Munich; Arts et Métiers ParisTech, Paris
- Occupation: Architect
- Spouse: Ida Lafite
- Children: Félix
- Practice: Henrik Koch; Mihály Pollack
- Buildings: Budapest Opera House; Saint Stephen's Basilica; Buda Castle

Miklós Ybl (6 April 1814 in Székesfehérvár – 22 January 1891 in Budapest) was one of Europe's leading architects in the mid to late nineteenth century as well as Hungary's most influential architect during his career. His best-known building is the Hungarian State Opera House in Budapest (1875–84).

== Background ==
After graduating from the Institute of Technology in Vienna, Ybl became Mihály Pollack's assistant in 1832 and worked in Henrik Koch's office between 1836 and 1840. Following this, he moved to Munich and studied at the Academy of Fine Arts and then to Italy to study. After his return, he entered into partnership with the son of Mihály Pollack, Ágoston; together they refurbished the Ikervár Castle of Count Lajos Batthyány. His first main work was the church in Fót, built between 1845 and 1855.

His early, large projects were built in Romantic style, influenced by eastern motifs. Although Romanesque shapes also occur in his later buildings, after his second study tour to Italy from 1860 he became interested in the possibility of the revitalisation of the Italian Renaissance style, and designed several neo-Renaissance buildings. Many of his buildings became, and indeed are still today, determinant elements of the cityscape of Budapest: Saint Stephen's Basilica (1867–91), the Rác Thermal Bath, the former Palace of Customs, (1871–74), and the throne room and Krisztinaváros wing of the Royal Palace. He also built countless churches, apartments and castles in the provinces.

The annual architectural prize founded in 1953 was named after him in his honor.

2014 was named "Ybl Memorial Year" in Hungary.

== Gallery ==
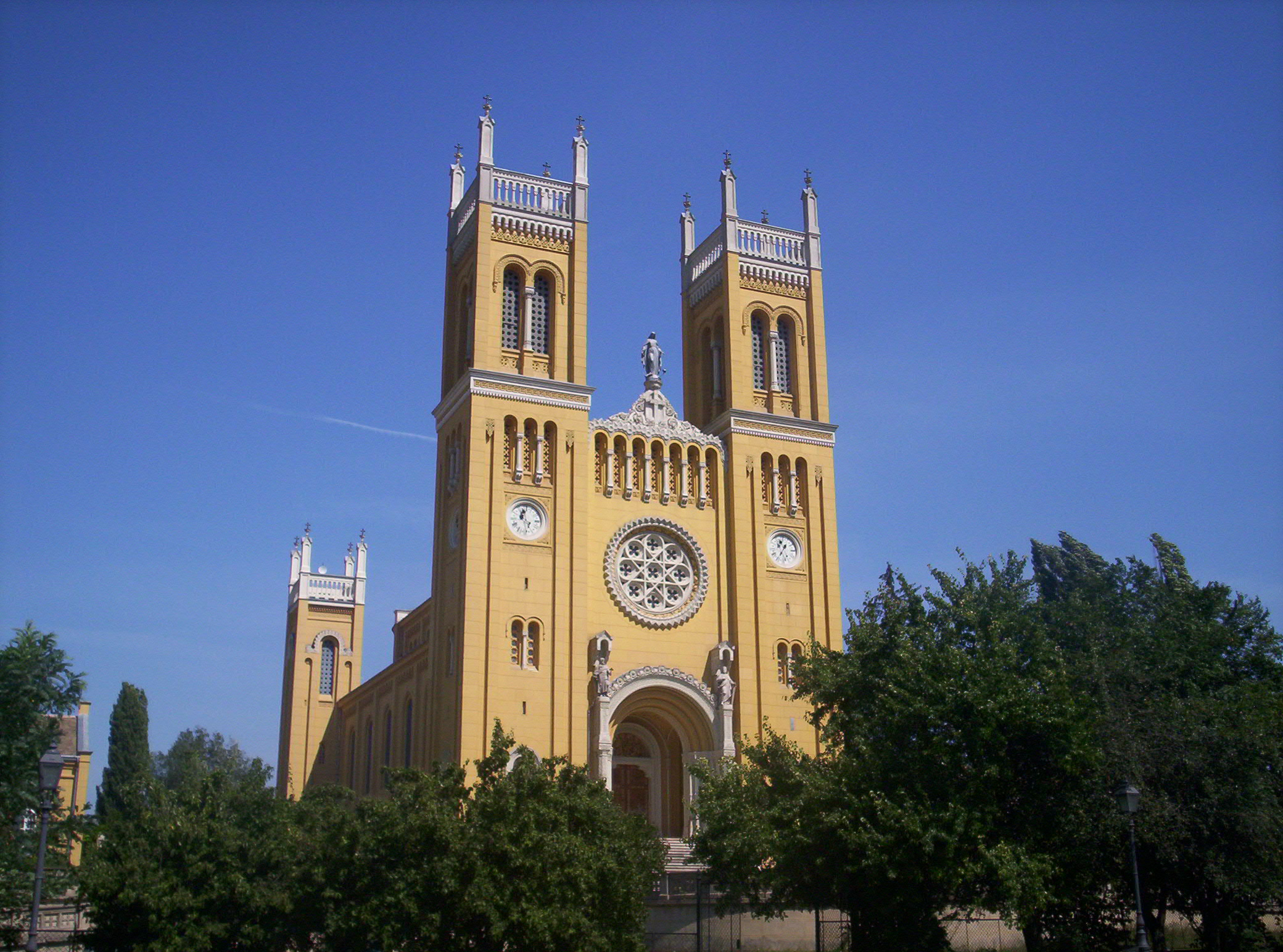
Catholic church in Fót

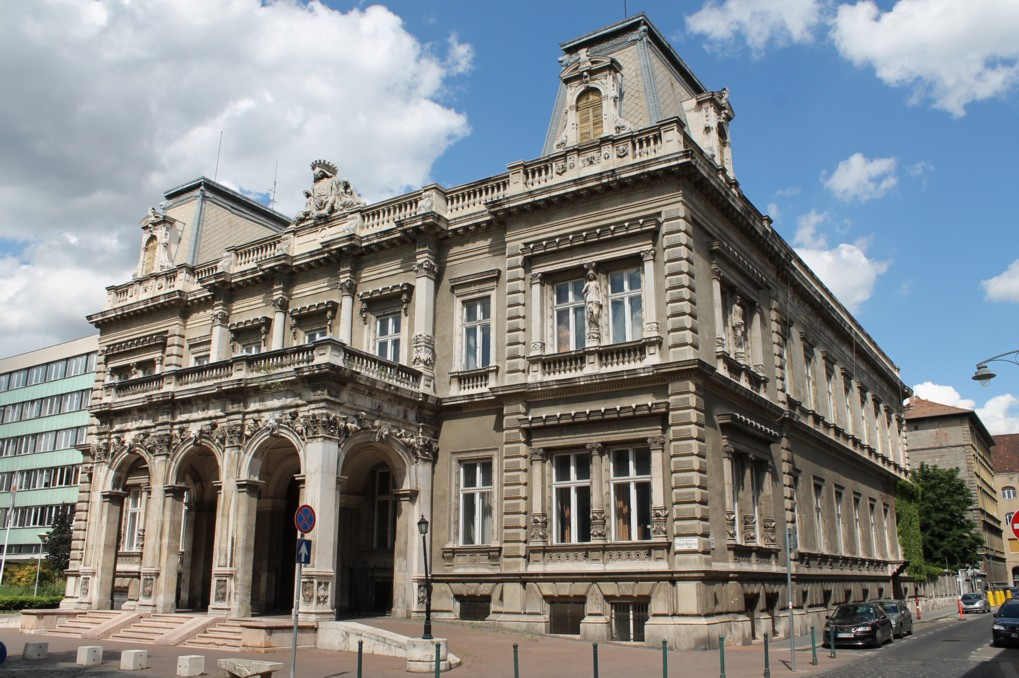
Károlyi Palace, Budapest

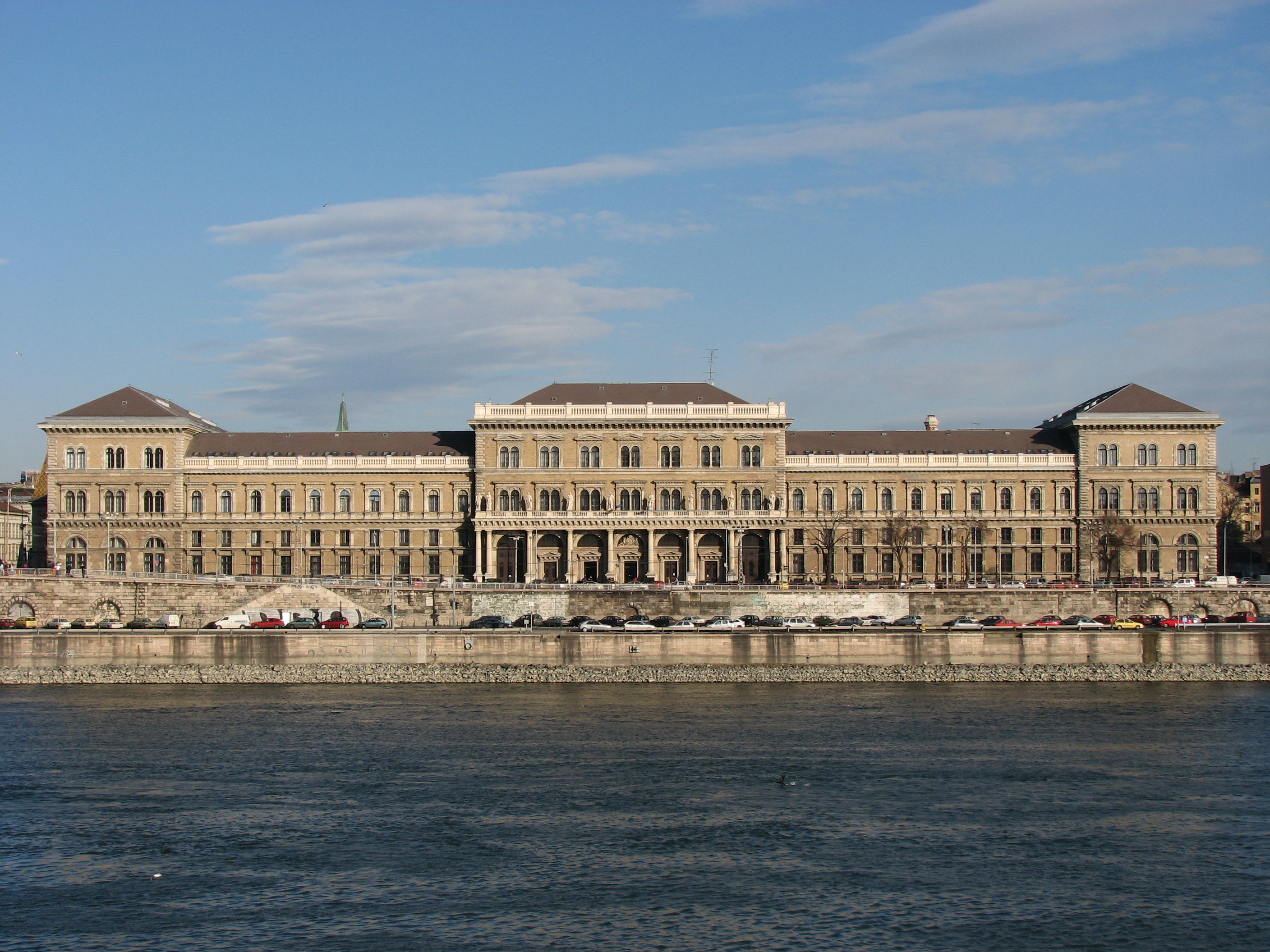
Ybl designed the Palace of Customs which today houses the Corvinus University of Budapest

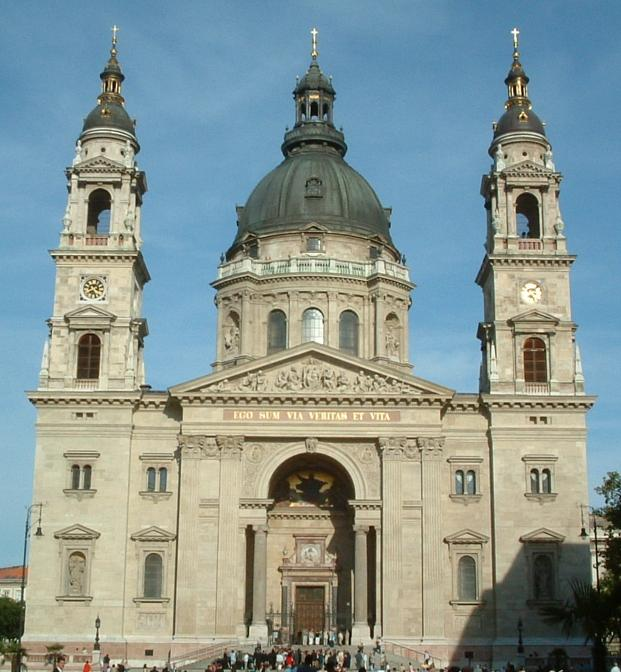
Saint Stephen's Basilica in Budapest

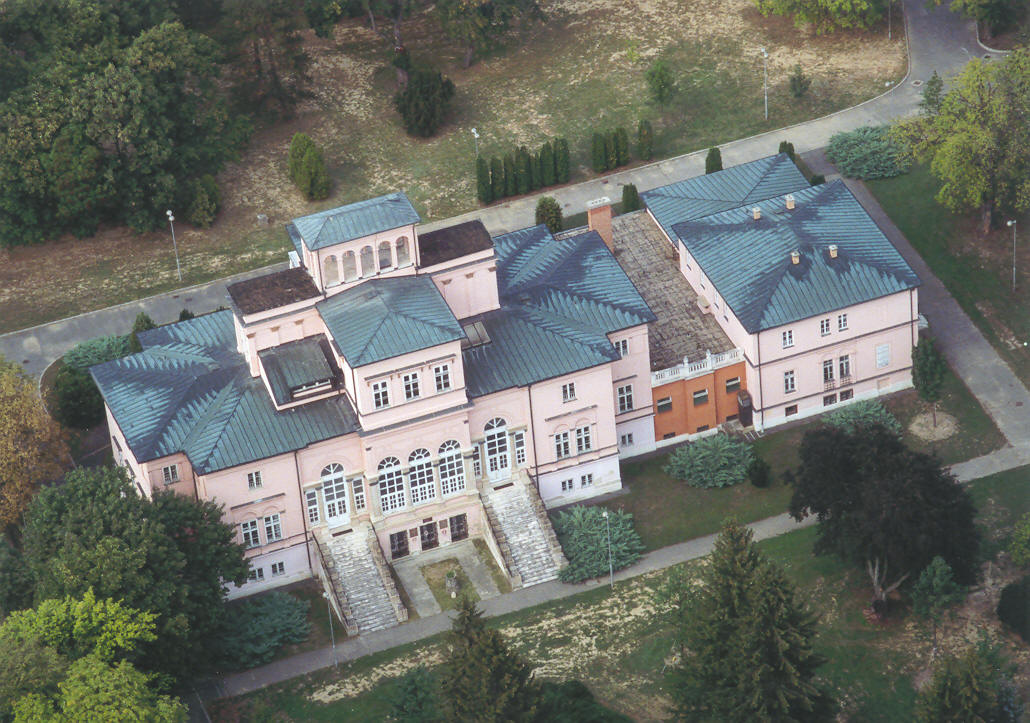
Ikervár - Palace

== Major works ==
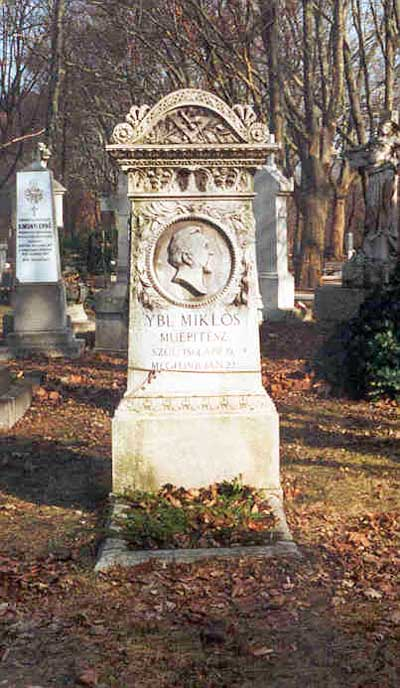
Ybl's burial place, plot 34/1, in the Kerepesi Cemetery, Budapest

Marble bust of the famous architect Miklós Ybl located in the grand staircase hall of the Hungarian State Opera House sculpted by the Hungarian artist Eduard "Ede" Telcs (12 May 1872 – 18 July 1948).

- 1845–1849: Fót, Károlyi Castle rebuilding.
- 1845–1855: Fót, Roman Catholic church
- c. 1852: Budapest, Grabovszky – (Rózsa-) villa
- 1857–1858: Budapest, National stables
- c. 1860: Albertirsa, Szapáry chapel crypt
- c. 1860: Leányfalu, Gyulai-villa
- c. 1860: Gerla, Wenckheim castle
- 1860–1864: Nagycenk, R.C. church
- 1862: Kecskemét, Evangelical church
- 1862–1865: Budapest, Festetics Palace
- 1862-1864: Ečka, R.C. church
- 1863: Budapest, German theatre (not built)
- 1863: Budapest, Károlyi Palace
- 1863–1864: Budapest, MTA building
- c. 1865: Fegyvernek, Szapáry Castle
- 1865–1866: Budapest, old parliament building
- 1865–1879: Budapest, R.C. church, Bakáts squ.
- 1867: Budapest, Pálffy Palace
- 1867–1891: Budapest, István Szent basilica. Began by Hild, continued by Ybl and finished by J. Kauser
- 1869: First National Savings Bank of Pest
- 1870–1874: Budapest, Customs house
- 1871: Budapest, Margit bridge (not built)
- c. 1872: Parád, Ybl Hotel
- 1873–1884: Budapest, Hungarian State Opera House
- 1874–1982: Budapest, Castle kiosk and bazaar
- 1875–1879: Ókígyós, Wenckheim castle
- 1875-1884: Hungarian State Opera House in Budapest
- 1880–1882: Parádsasvár, Károlyi Castle
- 1880–1891: Budapest, Castle hill remodelling
- 1882–1888: Budapest, Budapest Clarisseum R.C. church
- 1883–1884: Budapest, Széchenyi Palace (demolished)
- c. 1888: Parád, Erzsébet Hotel
- and other structures in Csurgó, Doboz, Kétegyháza, Lengyeltóti, Mácsa, Marcali, Ókigyós, Surány, etc.

== See also ==
- List of Hungarian architects
