= Károlyi =

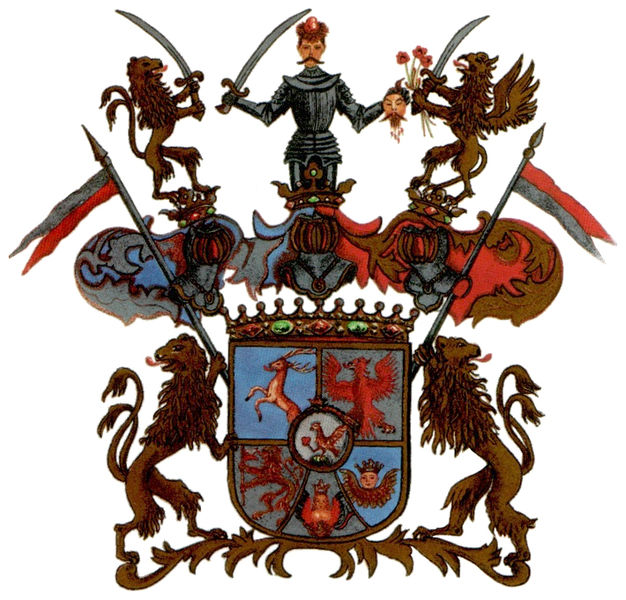
Coat of arms of Counts Károlyi de Nagy-Károly

The House of Károlyi is the name of an old and prominent Hungarian noble family, whose members held the title of Count in Hungary, awarded to them on 5 April 1712 by Charles VI, Holy Roman Emperor. They claim descent from the late 9th century Magyar chieftain Kond.

== Notable members ==
- Károlyi family
  - László Károlyi (1622–1689), Hungarian politician
  - Sándor Károlyi (1668–1743), first count
  - Ferenc Károlyi (1705–1758) Hungarian count and soldier
  - Antal Károlyi (1732–1791), Hungarian politician
  - József Károlyi (1768–1802), Hungarian politician
  - István Károlyi (1797–1881), Hungarian politician
  - Lajos Károlyi (1799–1863), Hungarian politician
  - György Károlyi (1802–1877), Hungarian politician
  - László Károlyi (1824–1852), Hungarian naval officer
  - Alajos Károlyi (1825–1899), Austro-Hungarian diplomat
  - Gyula Károlyi (1871–1947), former Prime Minister of Hungary (1931–1932)
  - Mihály Károlyi (1875–1955), former Prime Minister of Hungary (1918–1919)
  - Tibor Károlyi (politician) (1843–1904), Hungarian politician
  - Manó Ferenc Károlyi de Nagykároly (1821–1879), Hungarian politician
  - Julian von Károlyi (1914–1993), Hungarian-German pianist
- Karolys family
  - Ecuadorian descendants of Count Ede Mano Ferenc Károlyi de Nagykároly (1821–1879)
    - Gonzalo Karolys (1923–2020), President of the Ecuadorian Supreme Court
    - Marcelo Karolys (born 1943), Ecuadorian Industrialist in the oil industry
    - Rodrigo Karolys (born 1979), Ecuadorian English teacher and translator

== See also ==
- Károly, a Hungarian given name and surname
- Karoli (disambiguation)
- Károlyi Castle
- Károlyi Palace
- Nagykároly or Carei, a Hungarian-majority town in Satu Mare County, Romania
- List of titled noble families in the Kingdom of Hungary
