= József Károlyi =

Hungarian nobleman and soldier

Count József Károlyi
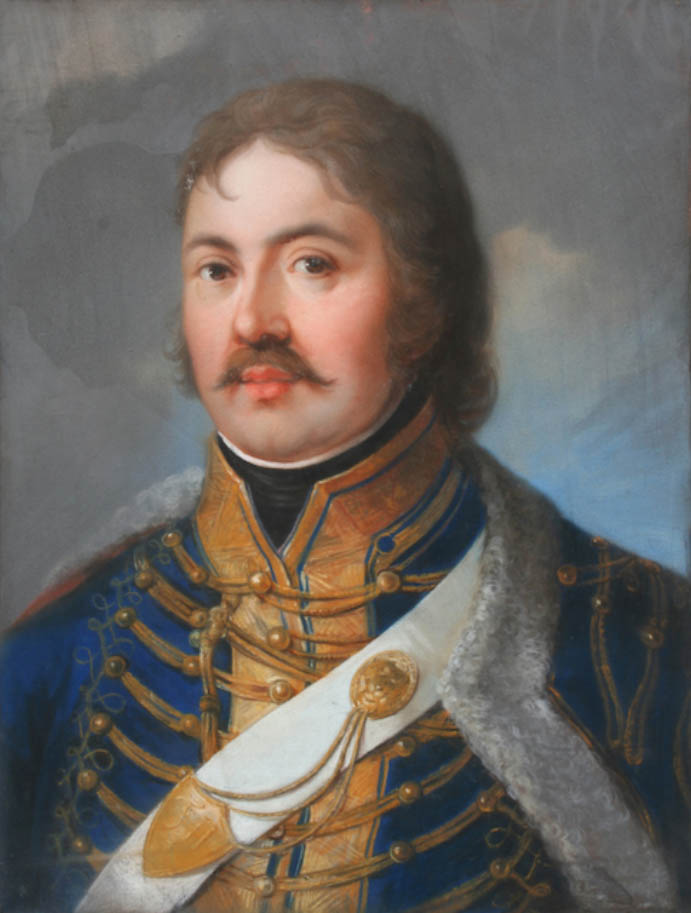
- Portrait of Count Károlyi, by János Mihály Hesz c. 1800
- Born: József Hilarius Sergius Marius Franz Anton Johann Nepomucen Károlyi de Nagykároly; 7 October 1768; Vienna, Archduchy of Austria, Holy Roman Empire
- Died: 4 April 1803 (aged 34); Vienna, Archduchy of Austria, Holy Roman Empire
- Spouse: Elisabeth von Waldstein-Wartenberg (m. 1789; died 1803)
- Children: 7
- Parent(s): Antal Károlyi; Józefa von Harrucker
- Relatives: Ferenc Károlyi (grandfather); Alajos Károlyi (grandson)

Count József Hilarius Sergius Marius Franz Anton Johann Nepomucen Károlyi de Nagykároly (7 October 1768 – 4 April 1803), was a Hungarian nobleman and soldier.

== Early life ==
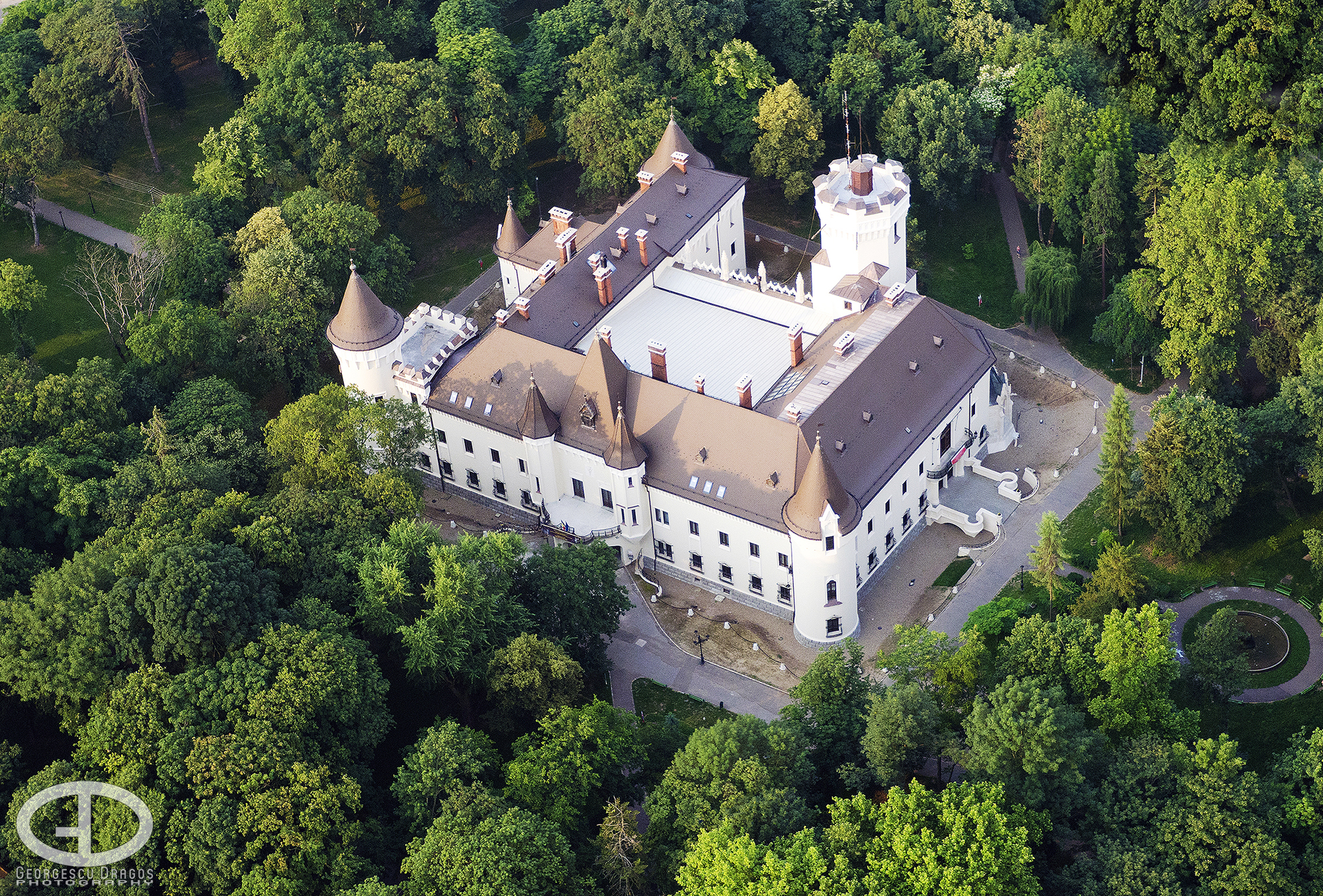
Aerial view of the Károlyi Castle in Carei

Károlyi was born in Vienna, the capital of the Archduchy of Austria on 7 October 1768. He was a son of Antal Károlyi de Nagykároly (1732–1791) and Józefa Antalné von Harrucker de Békés-Gyula, a daughter of Court Chamberlain, Baron Johann Franz Dominik Bernhard von Harrucker.

His paternal grandparents were Count Ferenc Károlyi (only surviving son of Count Sándor Károlyi) and Krisztina Csáky de Körösszegh (a niece of the Archbishop of Kalocsa, Cardinal Imre Csáky). His aunt, Countess Anna Károlyi de Nagykároly, was the wife of Count Pál Szapáry, and another aunt, Countess Eva Károlyi de Nagykároly, was the wife of Count József von Starhemberg.

He was educated at the Collegium pauperum nobilium in Vác, which was run by the Piarists under the direction of Cardinal Christoph Bartholomäus Anton Migazzi, the Prince-Archbishop of Vienna. While in school, he traveled extensively around Europe with his father, including dining with Chancellor Ferenc Esterházy, and attending an audience with Queen Maria Theresa. Beginning in 1785, he was taught law and history by university professors in Vienna, including by Baron Karl Anton von Martini, Joseph von Sonnenfels, Franz Anton Zeiller, Johann Heinrich von Heyden, Leopold Plech and Abbot Giacomo Brumati.

== Career ==
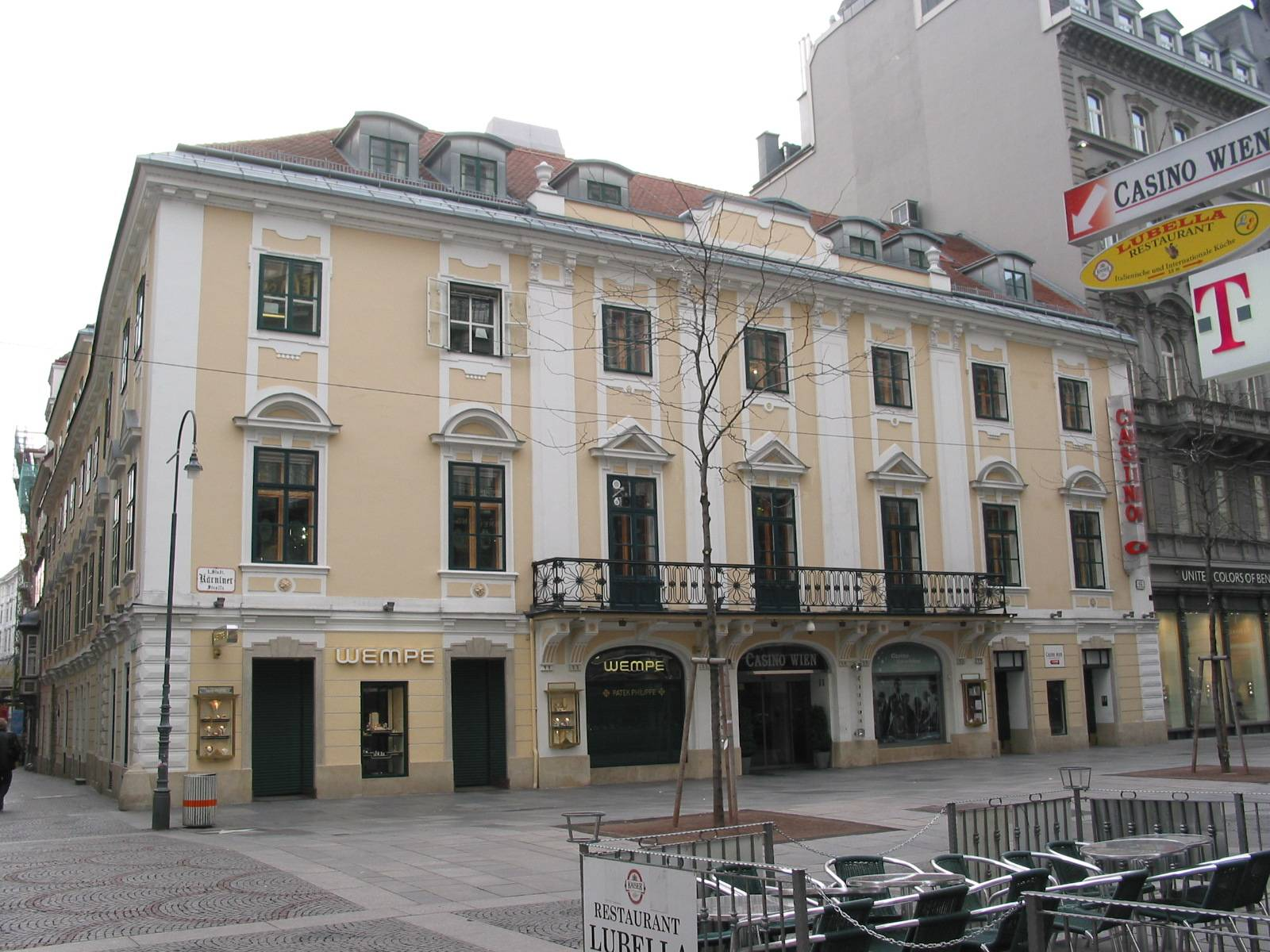
Palais Esterházy on Kärntner Straße, Vienna

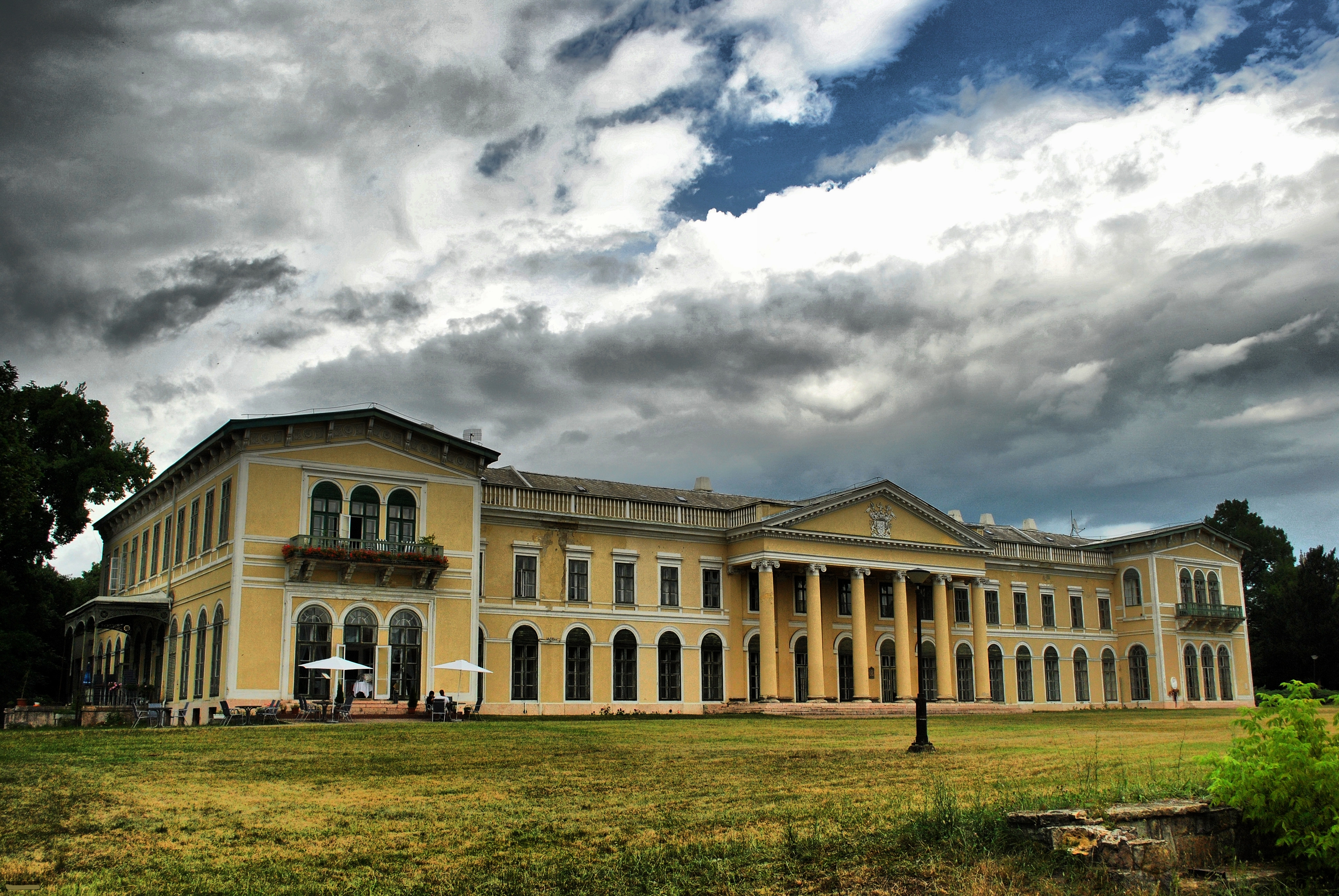
Károlyi Palace in Pest

In 1791, King Leopold II appointed him Royal Chamberlain and secretary of the Hungarian Royal Council. Although Leopold's mother, Queen Maria Theresa, had granted him the title of Lord Chancellor of Békés County, it had become vacant after the death of his maternal grandfather, Baron Johann Franz Dominik Bernhard von Harrucker, when he was still seven years old, the actual administration of the county was carried out by the Lord Chancellor's administrators instead of the Count. He resigned from this position in 1791 when he was appointed Lord Chancellor of Szatmár County. Following his appointment, reigning Baron Miklós Vécsey appointed an administrator alongside Károlyi. The appointment was announced on 14 October 1793, and he took up the office of the Lord in 1794 at the request of the orders of the Satu Mare County.

=== Military career ===
During the Napoleonic Wars, King Francis I of Hungary (also referred to as Emperor Francis II) called the nobles to arms on 8 April 1797, and Szatmár County elected Károlyi as their leader with the rank of colonel. He was also appointed Brigadier General of the armies of Satu Mare and Bihar counties. They set off for the Szombathely camp in mid-June, but the warring parties reached the Treaty of Campo Formio on 17 October 1797, which meant that their deployment was cancelled.

In the autumn of 1800, also during the Napoleonic Wars, another noble uprising was called and Károlyi was entrusted with leading the insurgents in Szabolcs, Máramaros, Bereg and Ugocsa counties, in addition to Szatmár County. However, they didn't have an opportunity to mobilize as the Treaty of Lunéville was signed in the Treaty House of Lunéville on 9 February 1801.

=== Estates ===
After his father's death in 1791, he likely lived permanently in Vienna, where, through his mother, he also owned a house, known today as the Palais Esterházy on Kärntner Straße. His maternal grandfather, Baron Franz von Harrucker, had acquired the palace in 1767 from the Grundemann von Falkenberg family. Despite Vienna being his permanent residence, he supervised the modernization of his family's longtime home, Károlyi Castle in Carei, in 1794.

The Károlyi Palace in Pest, which had been acquired by his father in 1768, was an important center of social life during József's tenure, often visited by the Palatine of Hungary Archduke Joseph of Austria and his wife, Grand Duchess Alexandra Pavlovna of Russia (daughter of Emperor Paul I of Russia and sister of emperors Alexander I and Nicholas I).

== Personal life ==
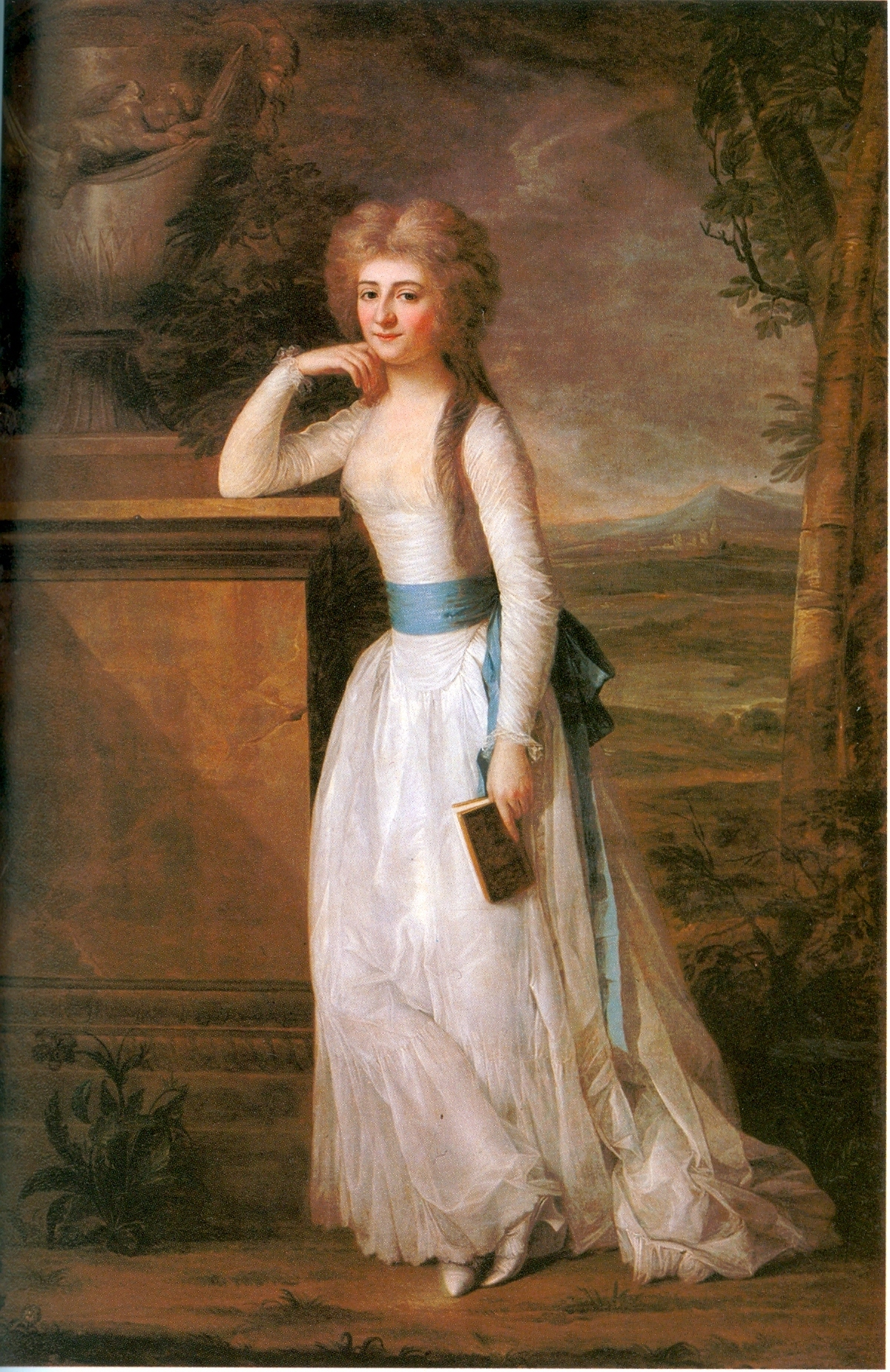
Portrait of his wife Elisabeth, by Georg Weikert, 1789

Károlyi's marriage contract to Countess Erzsébet "Elisabeth" von Waldstein-Wartenberg (1769–1813) was signed on 18 January 1789 and the wedding took place on 8 February 1789., a daughter of Georg Christian von Waldstein-Wartenberg and Countess Elisabeth Ulfeldt. Among her siblings were brother, Count Emanuel von Waldstein (who married Maria Theresa Sztáray), and sisters, Countess Maria Antonia von Waldstein (wife of Prince Ferenc Koháry of Csábrág and Szitnya), and Countess Wilhelmine "Vilma" von Waldstein (who married Count Jeromos von Colloredo-Mansfeld). Together, they were the parents of seven children, six of who survived to adulthood, including:

- Countess Mária Anna von Königsegg–Auendorf (1793–1848), who married Count Franz Xaver Karl zu Königsegg-Aulendorf, a son of Count Johann Ernst von Königsegg-Aulendorf.
- Count István Károlyi de Nagykároly (1797–1881), a member of the House of Magnates who married Countess Georgine Dillon, a daughter of Count Édouard Dillon. After her death in 1827, he married Franciska Romana Esterházy de Galántha, a daughter of Miklós Esterházy de Galántha and Marie-Françoise de Baudry, Marquise de Roisin. After her death in 1844, he married Mária Terézia Orczy de Orczi, a daughter of Baron György Orczy de Orczi.
- Count Lajos "Ludwig" Károlyi de Nagykároly (1799–1863), a member of the House of Magnates who married Countess Ferdinandine von Kaunitz-Rietberg, a daughter of Prince Aloys von Kaunitz-Rietberg and Countess Franziska Xaveria Ungnad von Weissenwolff.
- Countess Franciska Károlyi de Nagykároly (1800–1822), who married Count Albert Sztáray de Nagymihály et Sztára, a son of Count Mihály Sztáray de Nagymihály et Sztára.
- Count György Károlyi de Nagykároly (1802–1877), a member of the House of Magnates who married Countess Karoline Zichy-Vásonykeő, a daughter of Count Károly József János Nepomuk Zichy, and Maria Anna Batthyány.
- Countess Józefa "Josephine" Károlyi de Nagykároly (1803–1863), who married Franz Joseph Ferdinand von Trauttmansdorff-Weinsberg, a son of Prince Ferdinand von Trauttmansdorff and Countess Maria Karoline von Colloredo-Waldsee.

After receiving a wound in a duel over a woman, Károlyi died, at the age of 34, in Vienna on 4 April 1803. In his will, he asked his widow to raise their children in the Hungarian spirit. Accordingly, she moved the family, which had been living mostly in Vienna, to Hungary in 1808, and also purchased the Fót estate near Pest.

=== Descendants ===
Through his son Lajos, he was a grandfather of Count Alajos Károlyi de Nagykároly (1825–1889), an Austro-Hungarian diplomat who served as the Austro-Hungarian Ambassador to the German Empire and Ambassador to the United Kingdom, under Chancellor Otto von Bismarck.
