= Ferenc Károlyi =

Hungarian nobleman and soldier

Count Ferenc Károlyi de Nagykároly
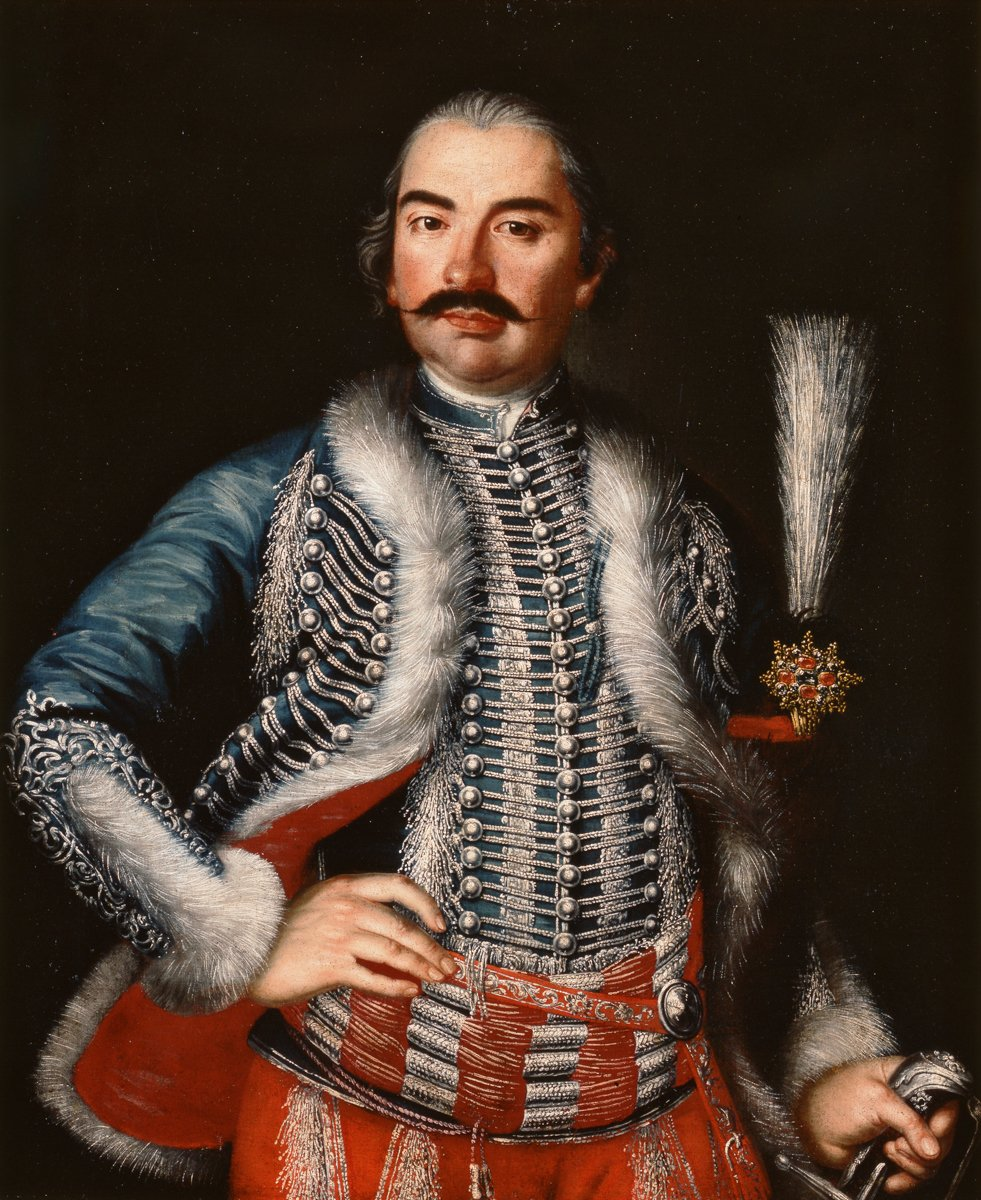
- Portrait of Ferenc Károlyi, c. 1750
- Born: 20 June 1705; Olcsva, Kingdom of Hungary
- Died: 14 August 1758 (aged 53); Carei, Kingdom of Hungary
- Spouse: Krisztina Csáky de Körösszegh
- Children: Antal Károlyi
- Parent(s): Sándor Károlyi; Krisztina Barkóczy de Szalai
- Relatives: József Károlyi (grandson)

Count Ferenc Károlyi de Nagykároly (20 June 1705 – 14 August 1758), was a Hungarian nobleman and soldier.

== Early life ==
Károlyi was born on 20 June 1705 at his family's castle in Olcsva in the Kingdom of Hungary. He was the only surviving son of Count Sándor Károlyi de Nagykároly (1669–1743) and Countess Krisztina Barkóczy de Szalai (1671–1724). His elder brother, László, had been appointed by King Leopold I of Hungary at the age of 13 as the hereditary governor of Szatmár County in the event of his father's resignation or death, but predeceased their father in 1710. His sister, Countess Klára Károlyi de Nagykároly, was the wife of Count Gábor Haller de Hallerkeõ. His father was a general of Francis II Rákóczi during the War of Independence and later negotiated the Treaty of Szatmár, which guaranteed autonomy to the Hungarian nobles.

His father brought him to the Diet of Hungary in 1712 to accustom him to the proximity of the Royal court and public affairs and then the Károlyi family was presented to King Charles III of Hungary (also known as Emperor Charles VI) in an audience in Bratislava. Ferenc began his studies at the University of Trnava, the Jesuit College in Nagyszombat in the 1715/1716 academic year.

== Career ==
Like his later elder brother, he was appointed hereditary governor of Szatmár County, in the event of his father's resignation or death, by the King on 24 July 1721. He was installed as a Baron on 5 February 1722 at the general assembly of Szatmár County.

=== War of the Polish Succession ===
During the War of the Polish Succession from 1733 to 1738, during which he was Colonel of his father's Károlyi Hussar Regiment. In the spring of 1735, he returned to the German battlefield, where his regiment managed to drive the French away near Büdlich and then at the Salm River. Even as the War was ending, according to an alliance with the Russians, he was obligated to provide assistance to the Tsar during the Russo-Turkish War. The Károlyi Regiment, led by Ferenc, participated in the Battle of Banja Luka in July 1737, and in the victorious Battle of Cornia in 1738, after which the Mehadia Strait was recaptured. In 1739, due to his military successes, Ferenc was also appointed as a Major General (Obristfeldwachtmeister, Generalfeldwachtmeister). Later the same year, he was appointed to lead two Hussar regiments, and achieved further success in the Battle of Pančova.

=== War of the Austrian Succession ===
In 1744, he was appointed commander-in-chief of the Trans-Tisza Region, including during the War of the Austrian Succession during which he supported Maria Theresa. (Note: The pretext of the War of the Austrian Succession was the right of Maria Theresa to succeed her father, Emperor Charles VI, as ruler of the Habsburg monarchy. France, Prussia, and Bavaria saw it as an opportunity to challenge Habsburg power, while Maria Theresa was backed by Britain, the Dutch Republic, and Hanover, collectively known as the Pragmatic Allies. As the conflict widened, it drew in other participants, among them Spain, Sardinia, Saxony, Sweden, and Russia.) After the War of Succession, he was appointed General of Cavalry (General der Kavallerie) in 1748. In the meantime, his public duties increased as he was appointed privy councilor in 1745, and as a judge of the seven-person board.

=== Estates ===
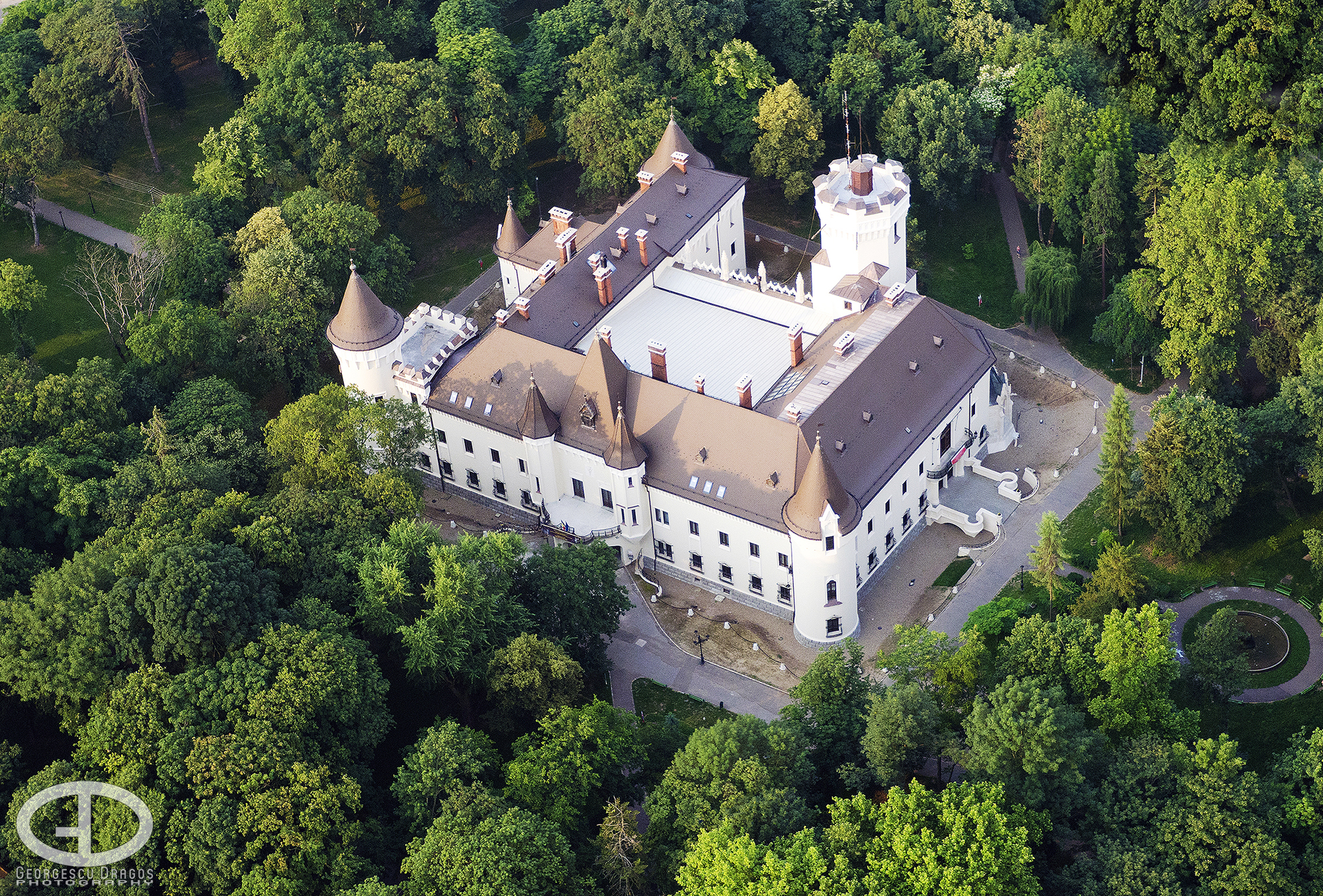
Aerial view of the Károlyi Castle, Carei

Ferenc acquired Ecséd manor (which his father had tried to acquire in 1731 as it was adjacent to the existing Károlyi estates in many places), which he transformed together with Nyíregyháza. Originally, Nyíregyháza was not very profitable due to its small population, however, in 1753 Ferenc decided to settle it, reaching an agreement with Szabolcs County, and the settlement patent issued in 1753 provided the conditions necessary for those moving to Nyíregyháza to start life here again. Nyíregyháza eventually flourished in the 1770s during his son Antal's ownership.

=== Nagykároly Printing House ===
Ferenc founded the Nagykároly Printing House in 1754, which operated with minor interruptions until 1827. The printing house received its royal license to operate on 27 October 1755. In its early years, the printing house published two geographical works, in addition to a few alphabet books. Towards the end of his life, Károlyi himself was involved in publishing texts, and two French translations of religious content were published under his name. The series of publications printed in Nagykároly includes, among others, two works by Miklós Révai published in 1778.

== Personal life ==
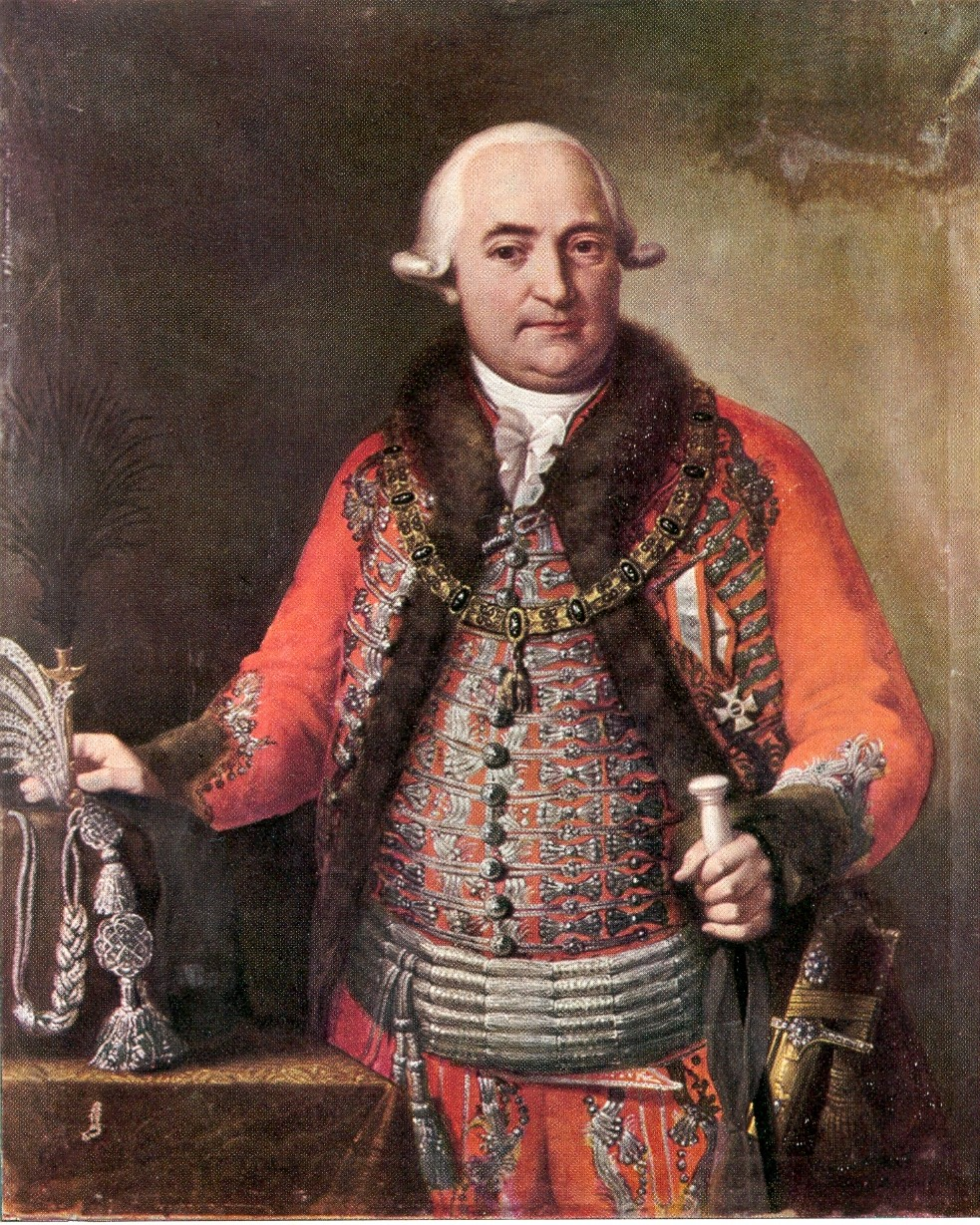
Portrait of his son, Antal Károlyi in Carei

On 25 August 1726, at Kluknó (today known as Szepesség), Károlyi was married to Countess Krisztina Csáky de Körösszegh (1706–1736), a daughter of Count Mihály Csáky de Körösszegh et Adorján (brother of Cardinal and Archbishop of Kalocsa Imre Csáky) and Éva Klobusiczky de Zétény. In 1727, Ferenc's father transferred Olcsva Castle and manor to Ferenc and his wife. Before her death in 1736, they were the parents of eight children, three of whom survived infancy:

- Countess Anna Károlyi de Nagykároly (1729–1767), who married Count Pál Szapáry in 1750.
- Countess Eva Károlyi de Nagykároly (1730–1799), who married Count József von Starhemberg, a son of Count Franz Wolfgang Anton Joseph Eustach von Starhemberg, in 1754.
- Antal Károlyi de Nagykároly (1732–1791), who married Jozefa Antalné von Harruckern, a daughter of Baron Johann Franz Dominik Bernhard von Harruckern, in 1757.

After a long illness, his wife died on 28 February 1736 and her funeral was held at Kaplony (Căpleni). Károlyi died on 14 August 1758 at Károlyi Castle in Carei.

=== Descendants ===
Through his son Antal, he was a grandfather of József Károlyi (1768–1803), who married Elisabeth von Waldstein-Wartenberg, a daughter of Georg Christian von Waldstein-Wartenberg.
