= Károlyi Castle (Carei) =

Castle in Carei, Romania

- Castelul Károlyi
- Carei, Satu Mare County, Romania
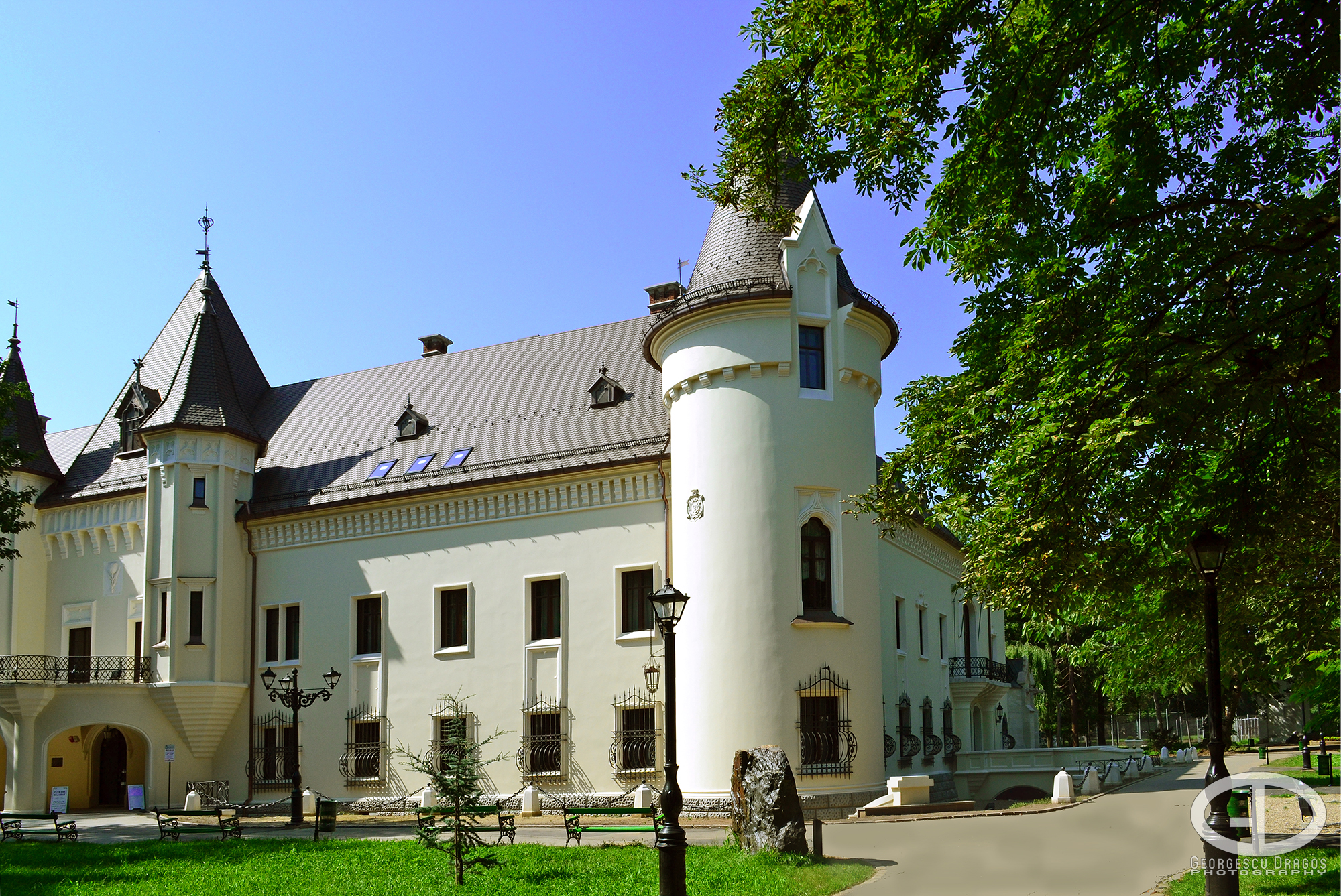

Site information
- Type: Castle

Location
- Location of Károlyi Castle in Romania
- Coordinates: 47°41′02″N 22°28′02″E

Site history
- Built: 1794
- Built for: Károlyi family
- Architect: Joseph Bitthauser, Arthur Meinig, Miklós Ybl

Károlyi Castle is a Gothic Revival castle located in Carei, Satu Mare County, Romania. Originally built as a fortress around the 15th century, it was converted to a castle in 1794, undergoing further transformations during the 19th century. The manor is surrounded by an arboretum which contains a great variety of species of trees and plants.

== History ==
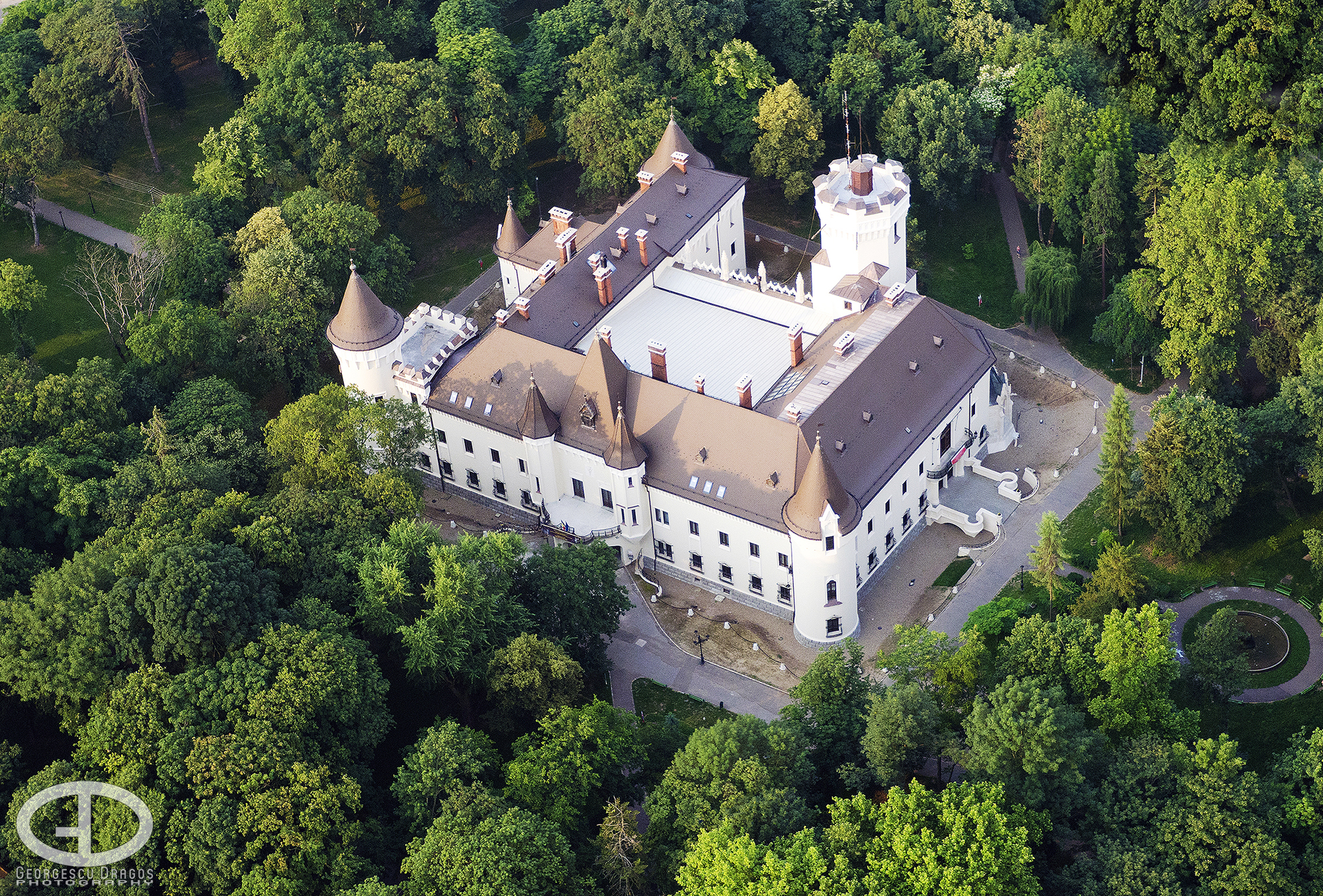
Aerial view of the castle, June 2013

László Károlyi Lancz began building the fortress in 1482. In 1526, the Károlyi banderium set out from the castle for the Battle of Mohács. In 1592, Mihály Károlyi equipped the castle with four defensive bastions against the Turks, widened the moats, and reinforced the raised defensive rampart with palisades. The Turks besieged the castle once, unsuccessfully.

In 1598, it was inhabited by 276 taxpayer families, but in the 17th century, its population dwindled due to repeated destruction by the Imperial Army. In 1615, the envoys of Matthias II and Gabriel Bethlen held talks in the castle about ending hostilities in the Satu Mare region. In 1622, Ferdinand II and Bethlen began the negotiations for the Peace of Nikolsburg in the castle.

After the Károlyi family converted to Catholicism, long disputes began between the family and the city's mostly Reformed industrial and noble population. In 1649, Jesuits settled in the city. In 1703, while Francis II Rákóczi, soon to be Prince of Transylvania, was returning from the Transylvanian campaign, he was stopped by Krisztina Barkóczi, on the orders of her husband, Sándor Károlyi, who had meanwhile sided with the Kurucs, opened the castle gates to him. Rákóczi stayed in the castle for 28 days, which later became one of the Kurucs' centers. In 1711, Sándor Károlyi and János Pálffy began negotiations for the Peace of Szatmár here.

After the peace, Károlyi began the repopulation of the settlement. In 1741, his son, Ferenc Károlyi donated fifty plots of land to what became Zsidóköz. From 1780 it was the seat of Satu Mare County and by 1828, the town had 11,000 inhabitants. It was hit by an earthquake in 1834. A casino was established in 1836 and a hospital in 1845. In the middle of the 19th century it held seven national fairs a year. The Swabian, Ruthenian, Romanian and Slovak population became Magyarized in their language during the 19th century.

=== Current castle ===
In 1794, the current Károlyi Castle was built in the late Baroque style on the site of a 15th-16th century castle, based on the designs of Joseph Bitthauser. In 1847, Miklós Ybl carried out renovations for István Károlyi, and between 1893 and 1896, it was rebuilt into a seven-towered knight's castle surrounded by a moat in a neo-Gothic style, based on the designs of Arthur Meinig of Saxony. In its layout and spatial organization, it follows the representative spaces of historicism, and continues the fashion of the Loire Valley chateaux spread by Gyula Andrássy. The current atrium was created by covering the square inner courtyard, which also appears as a two-story central hall, a characteristic of historicism. Today it houses a city museum, an exhibition hall, a library with 80,000 volumes and a cultural center. The top of its central bastion is a lookout tower. Its 12-hectare park is an arboretum, and was formed in its current form in 1877. Its oldest tree is a plane tree planted in 1810. On its edge stands a 33 m high romantic-style water tower built in 1888. The castle's former riding school housed a cinema in the 80s and 90s, then was used as a disco, and finally collapsed in the late 90s. Part of it has since been renovated and horses are still bred here. Riding lessons are held for children, and carriages can be rented for various events.

The castle was restored between 2009 and 2012 within Romania's Regional Operational Program.

== Gallery ==
=== Exterior, April 2014 ===
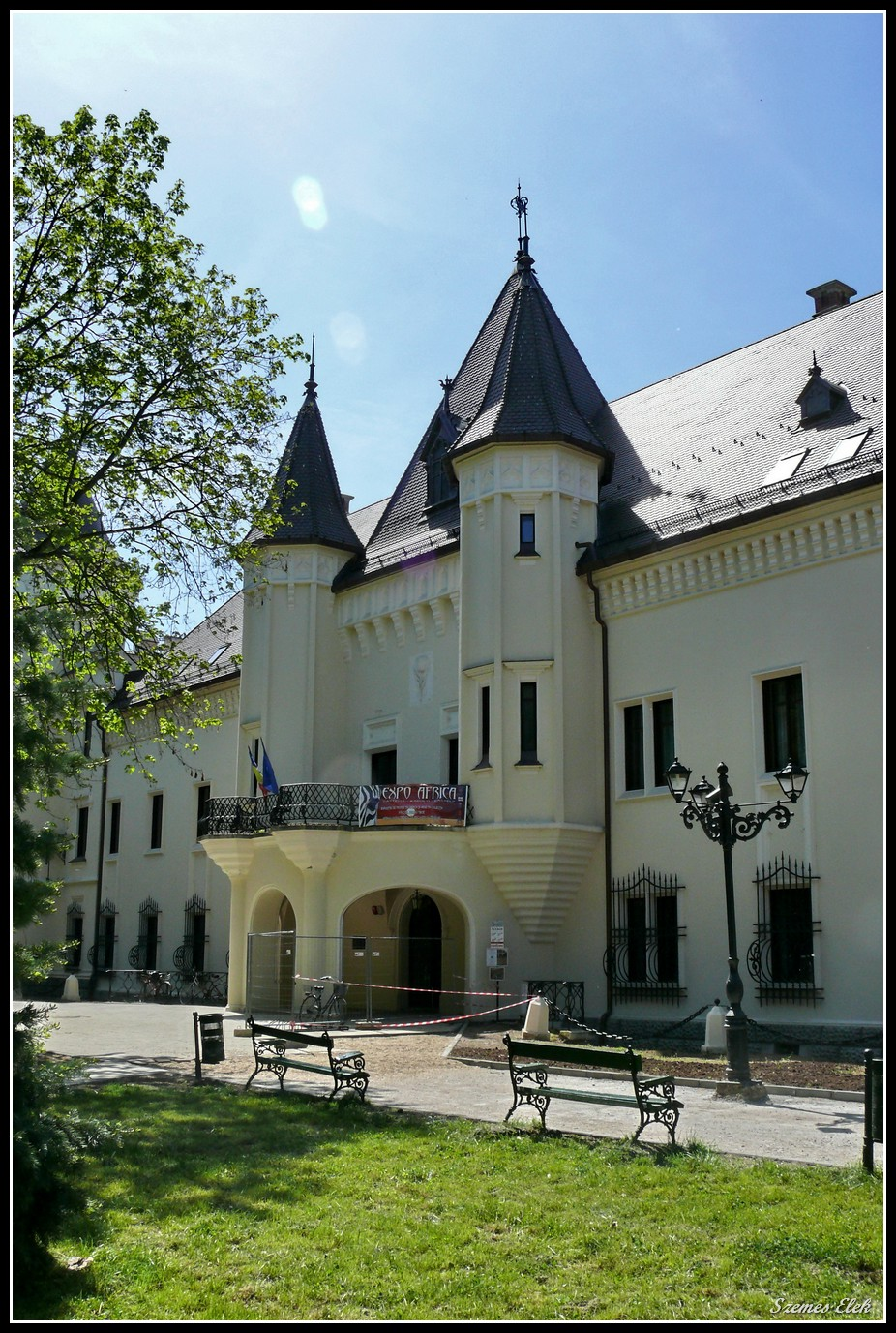

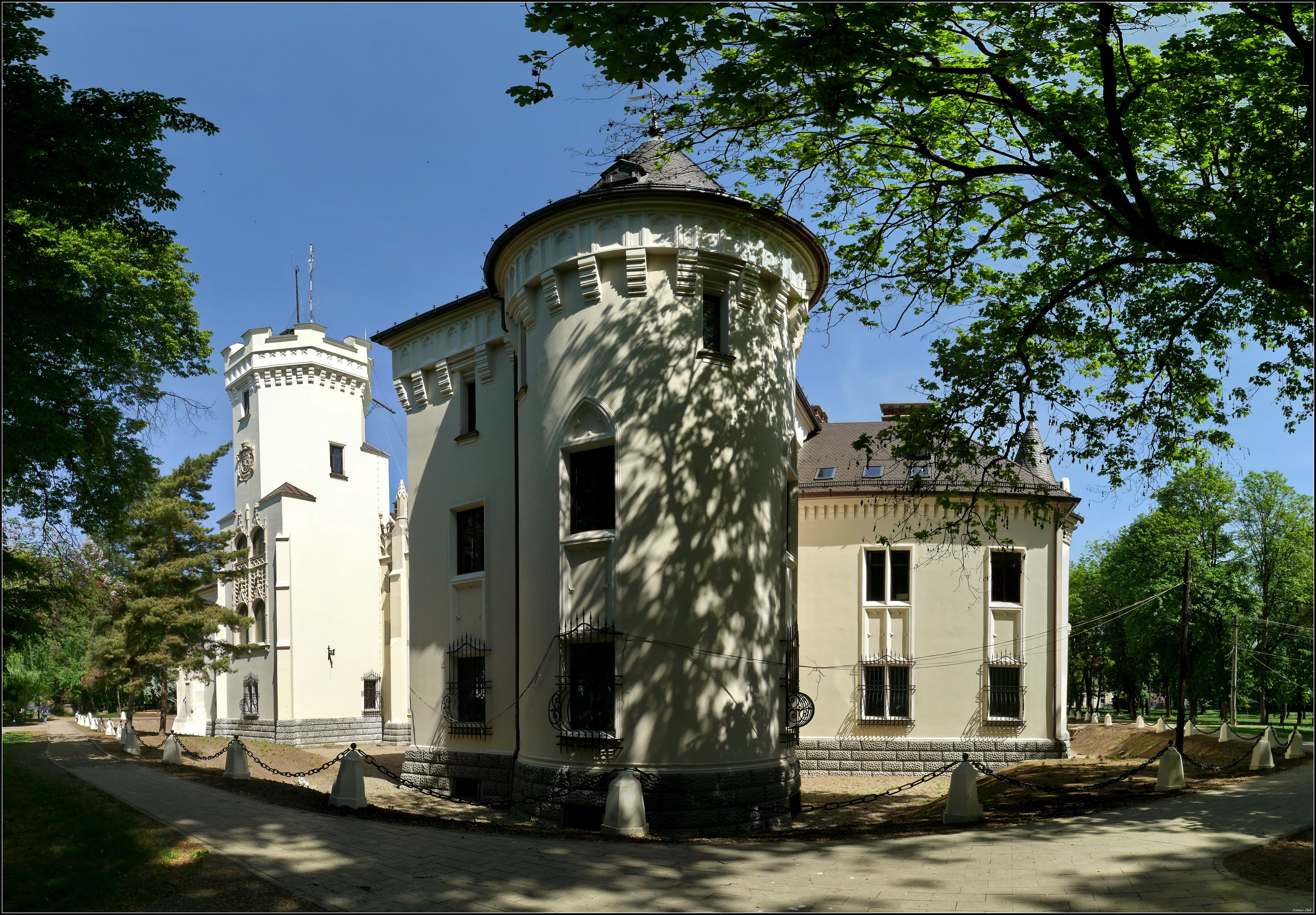

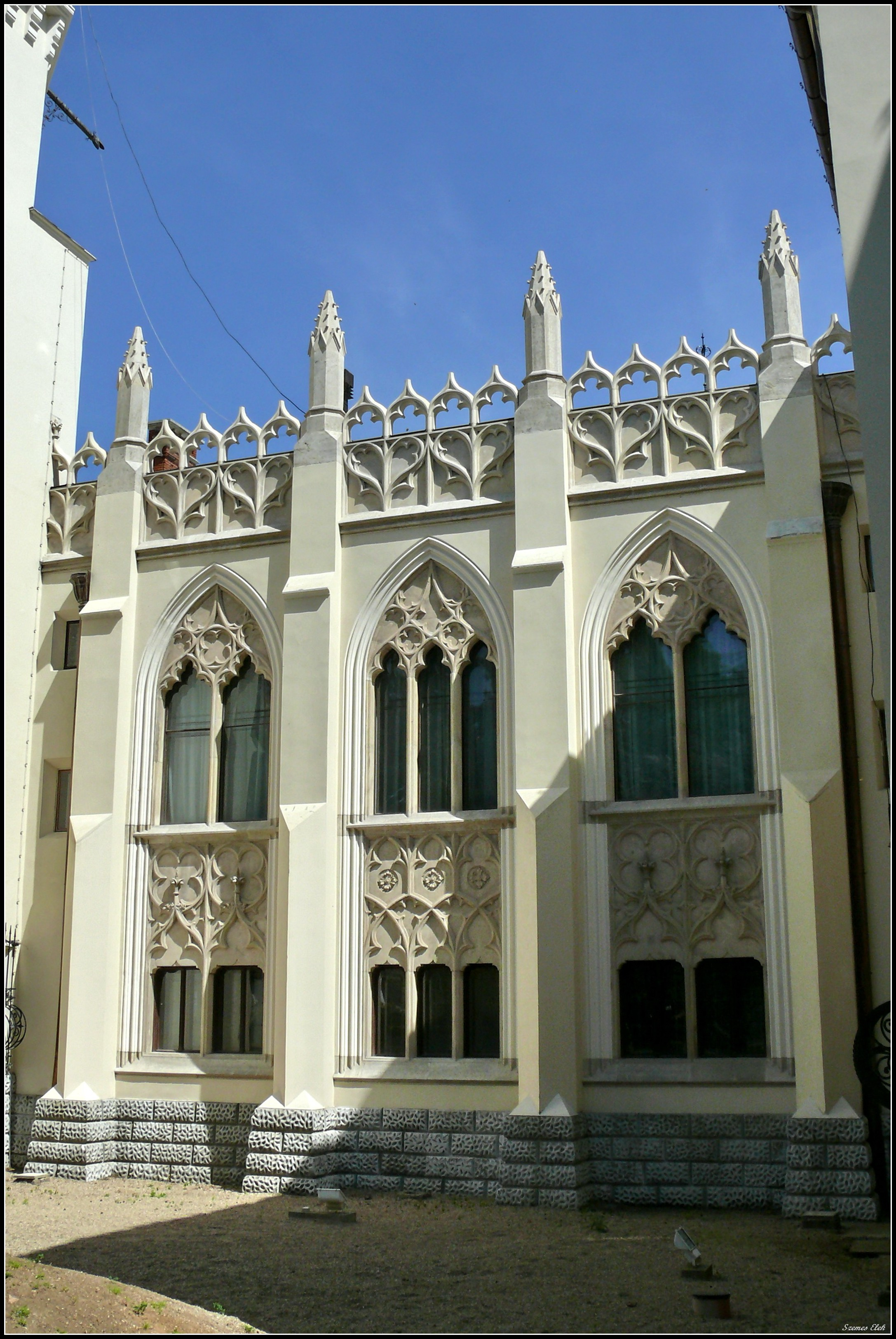

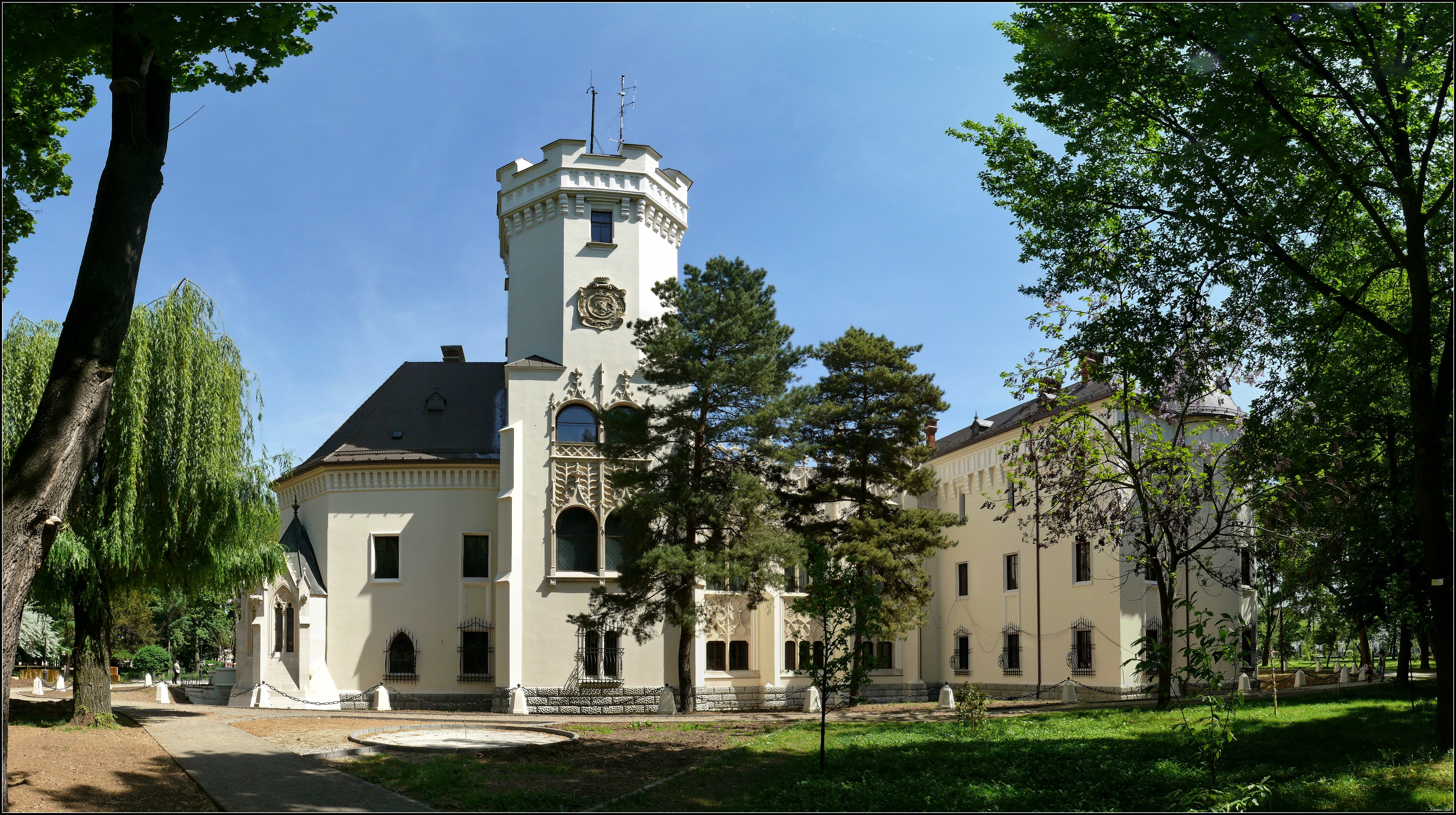

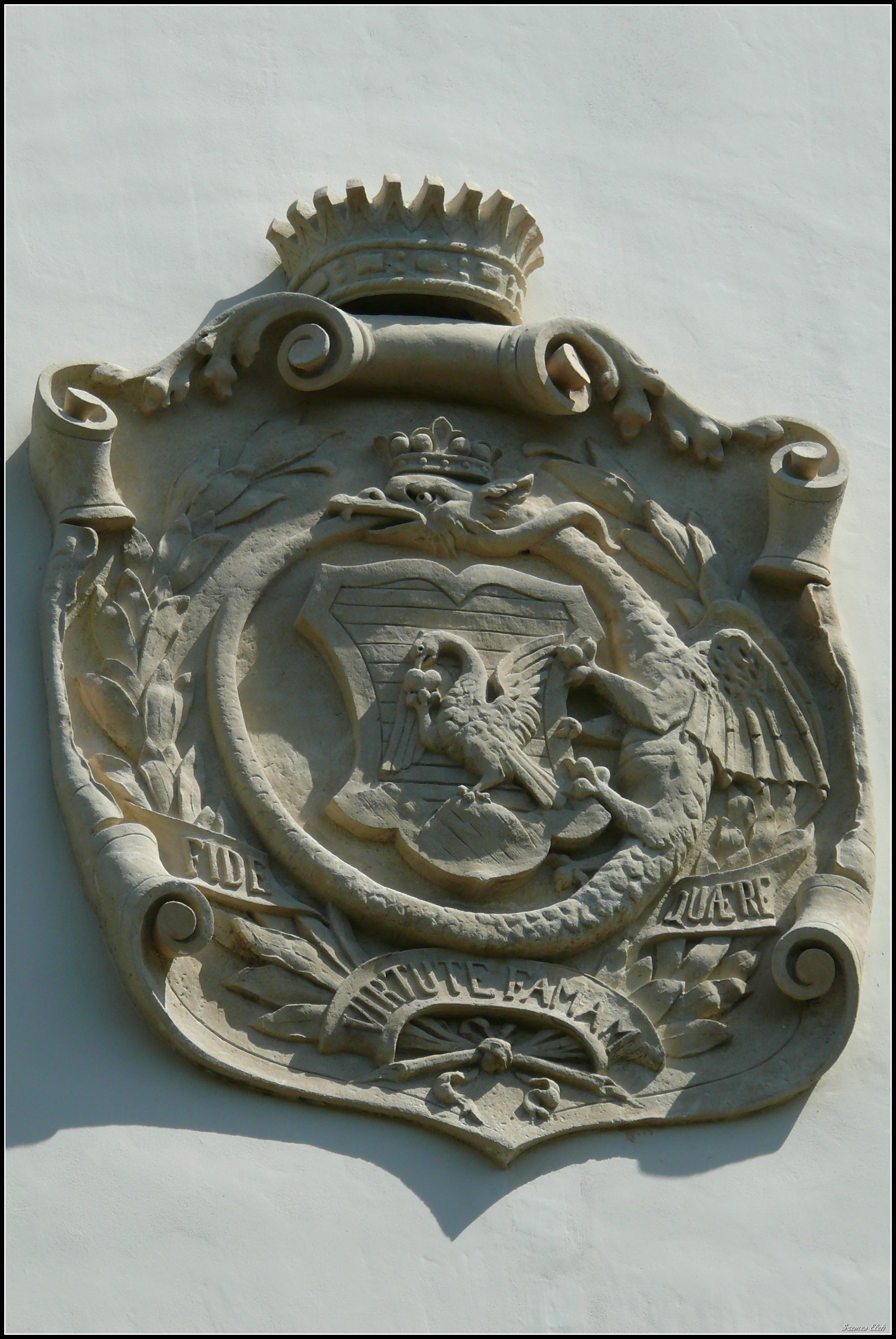

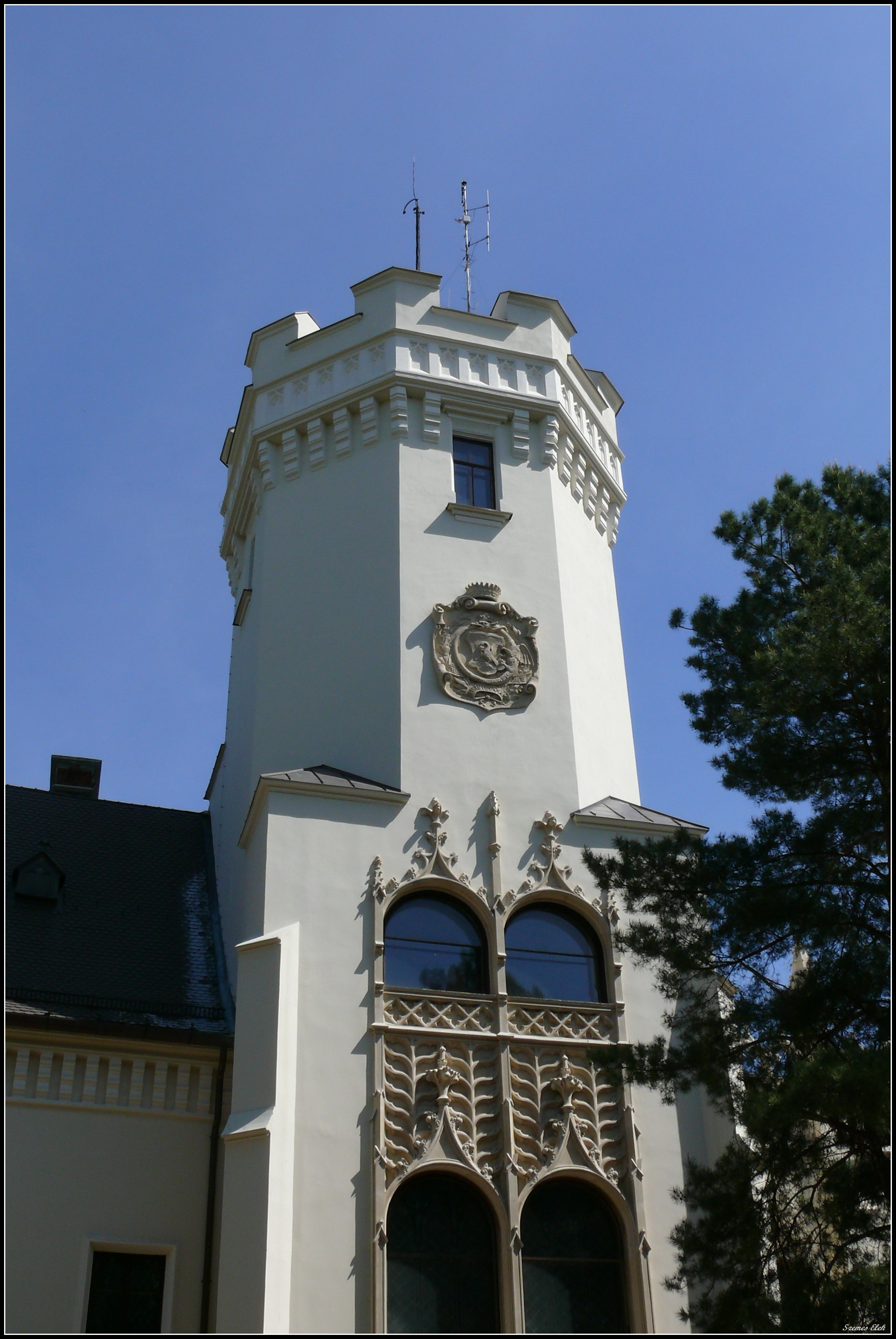

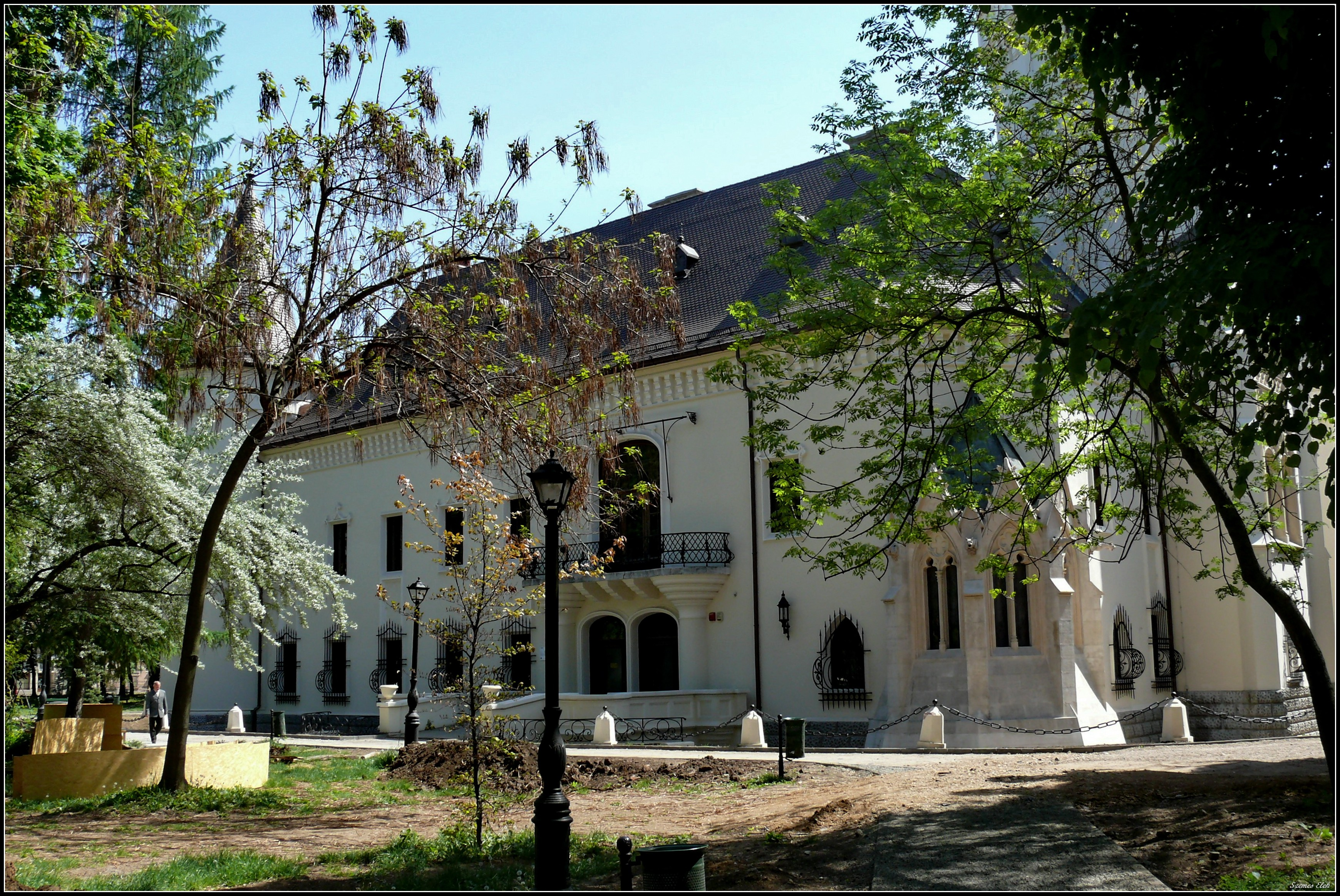

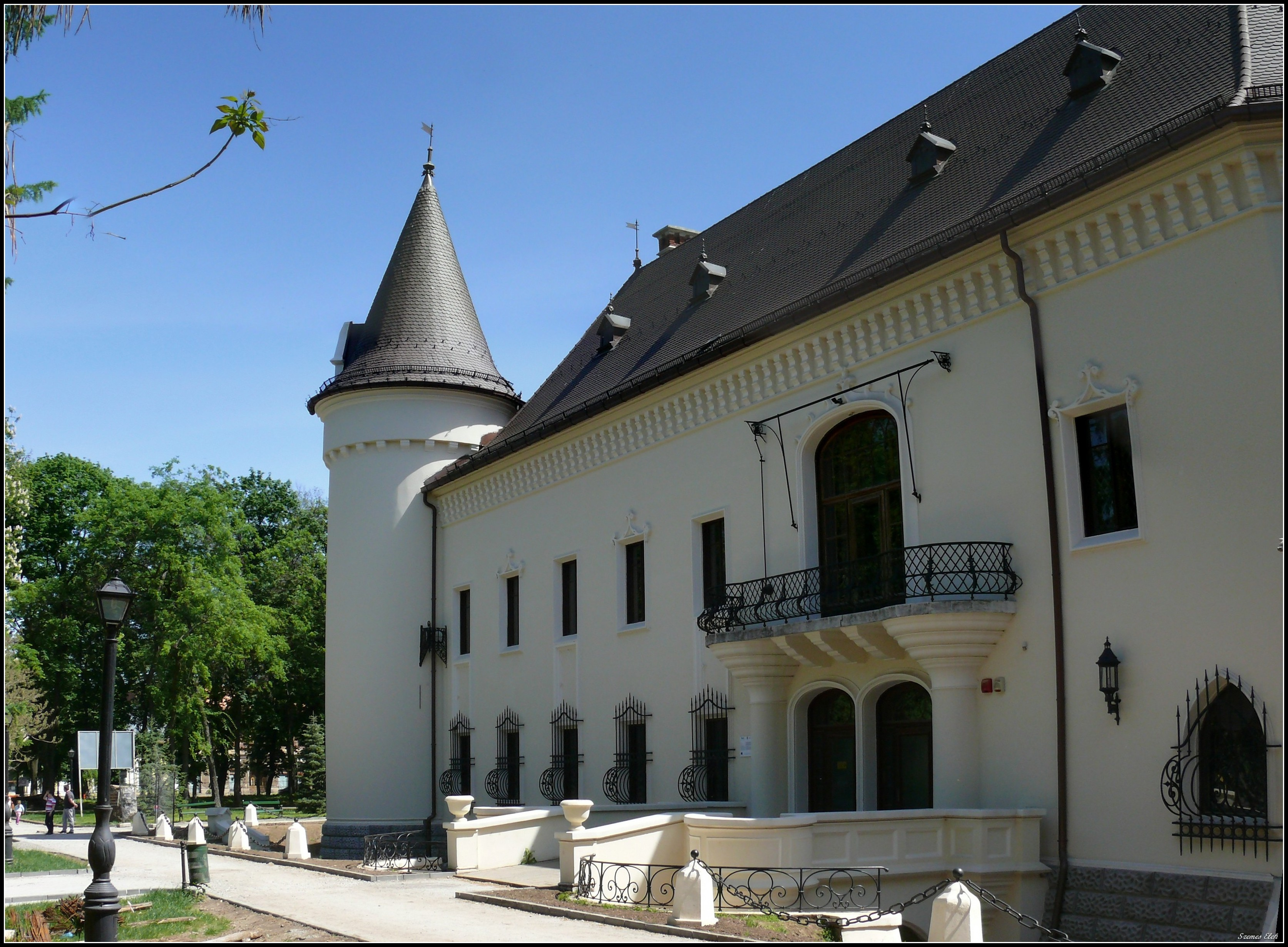

=== Interior, April 2014 ===
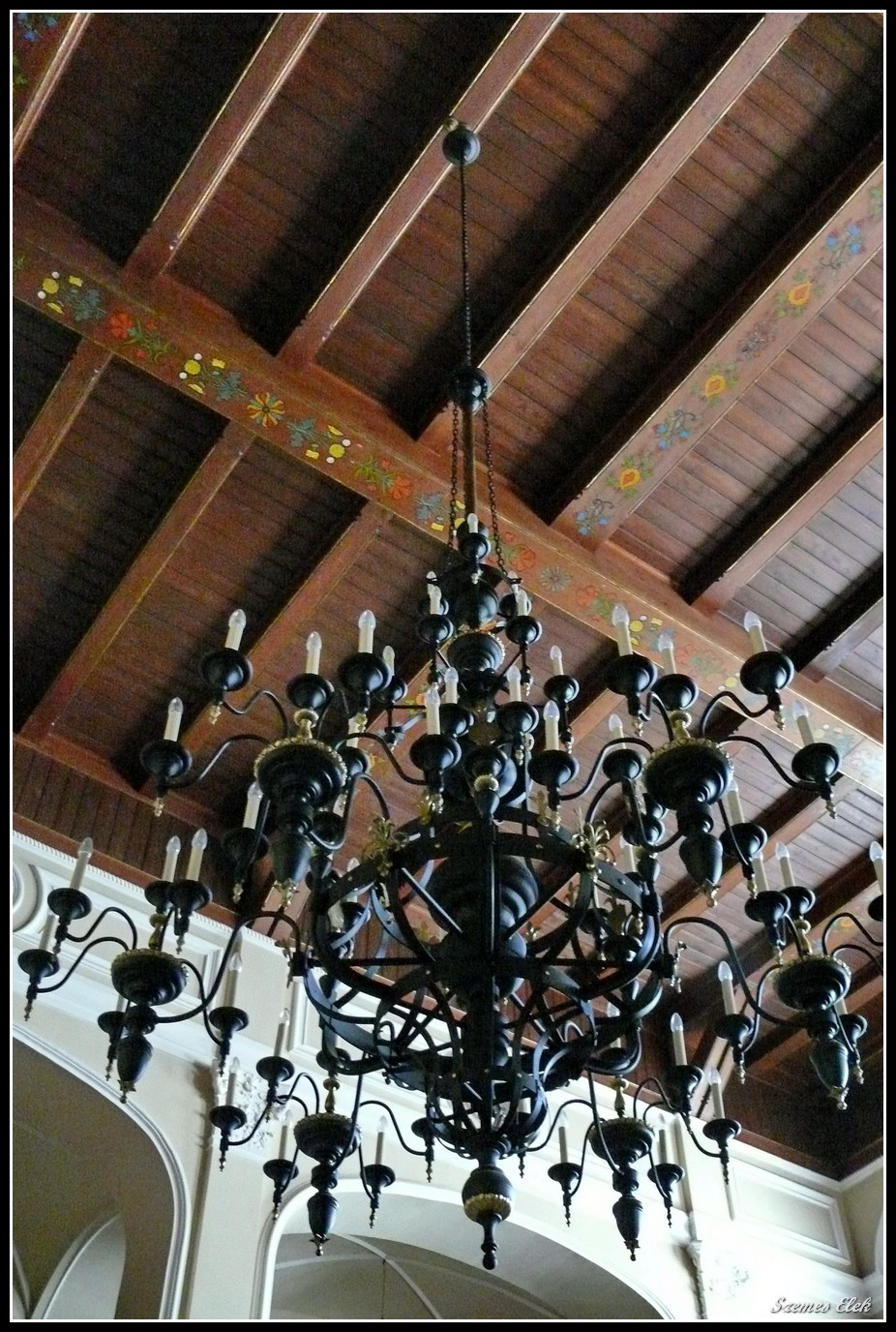

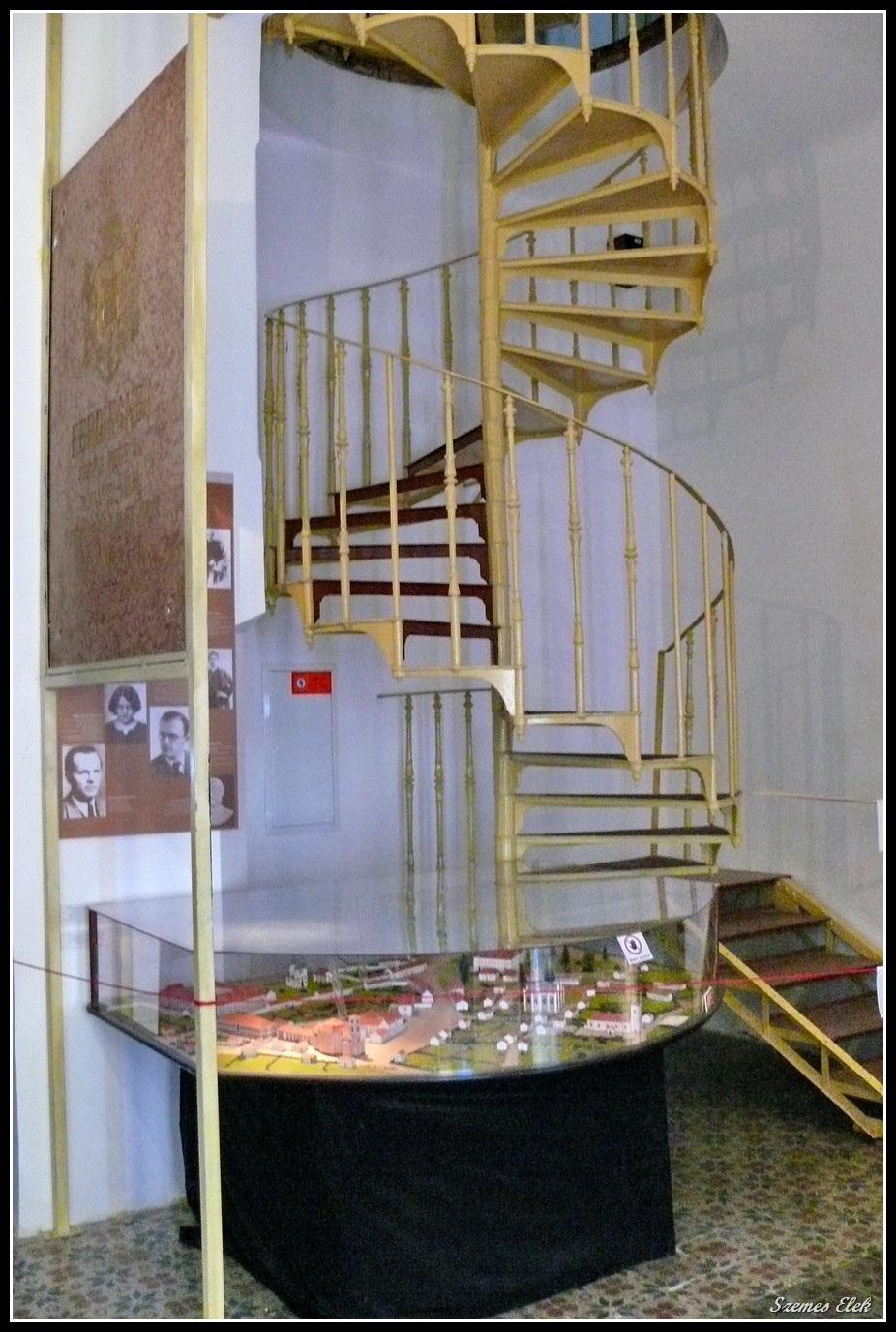

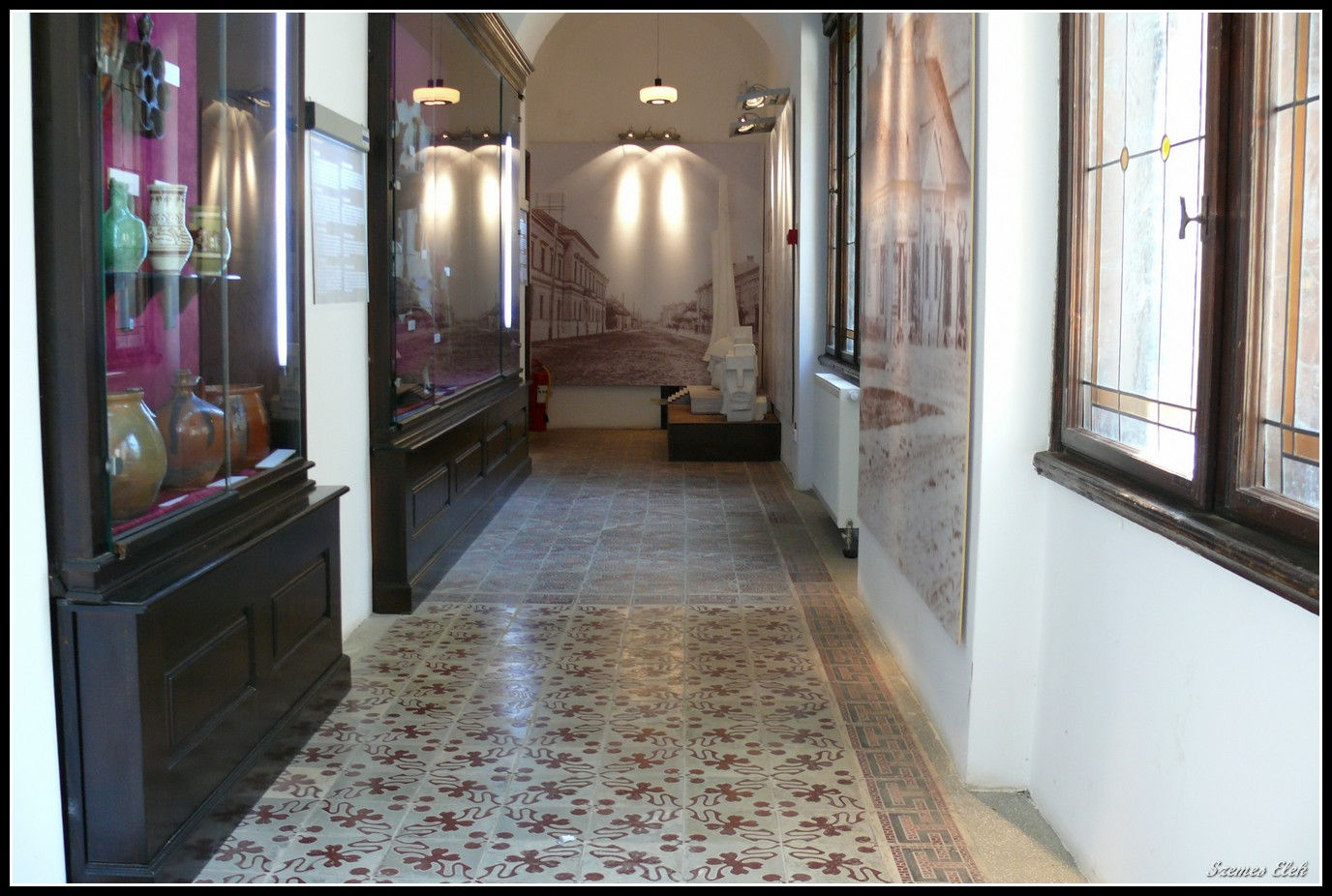

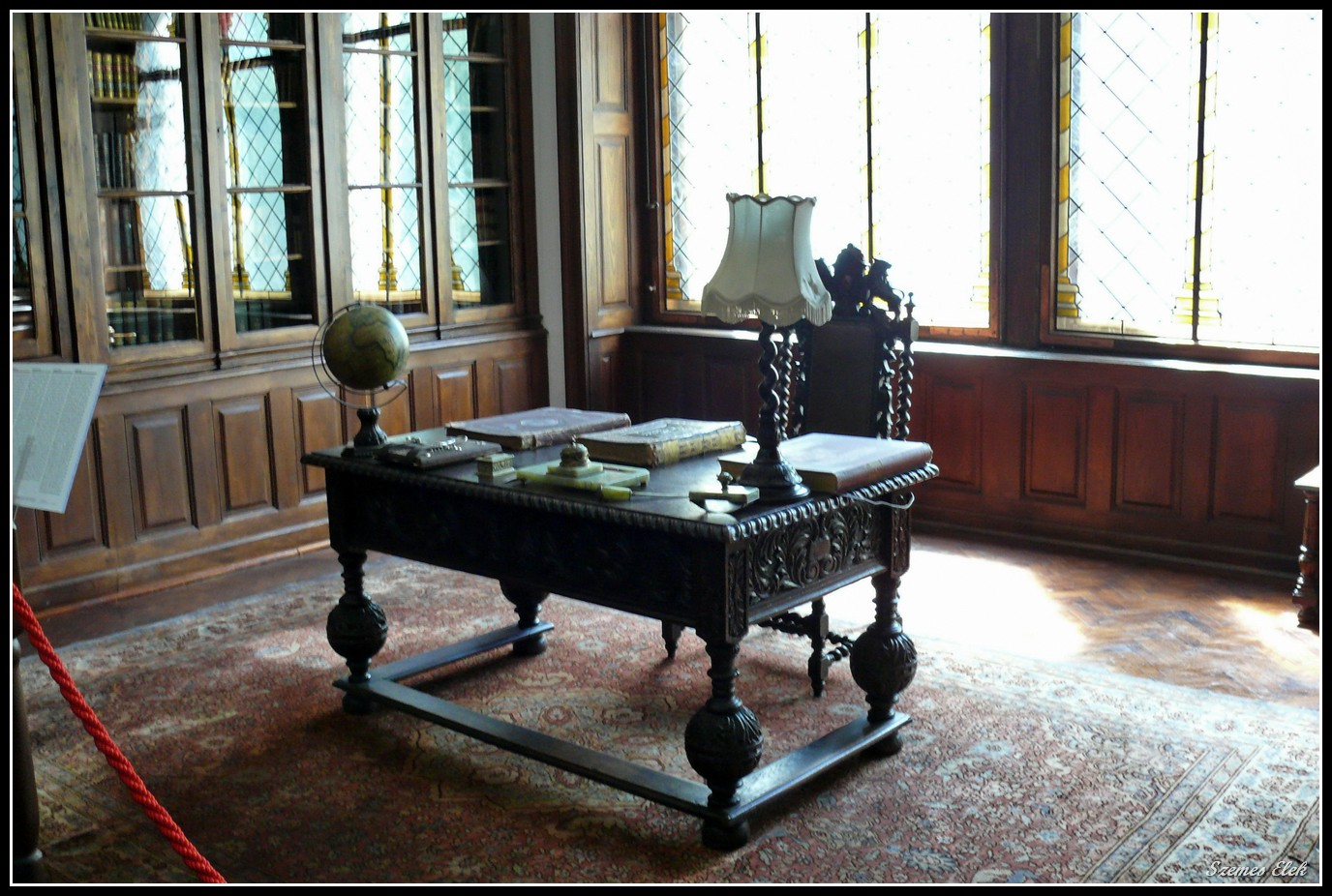

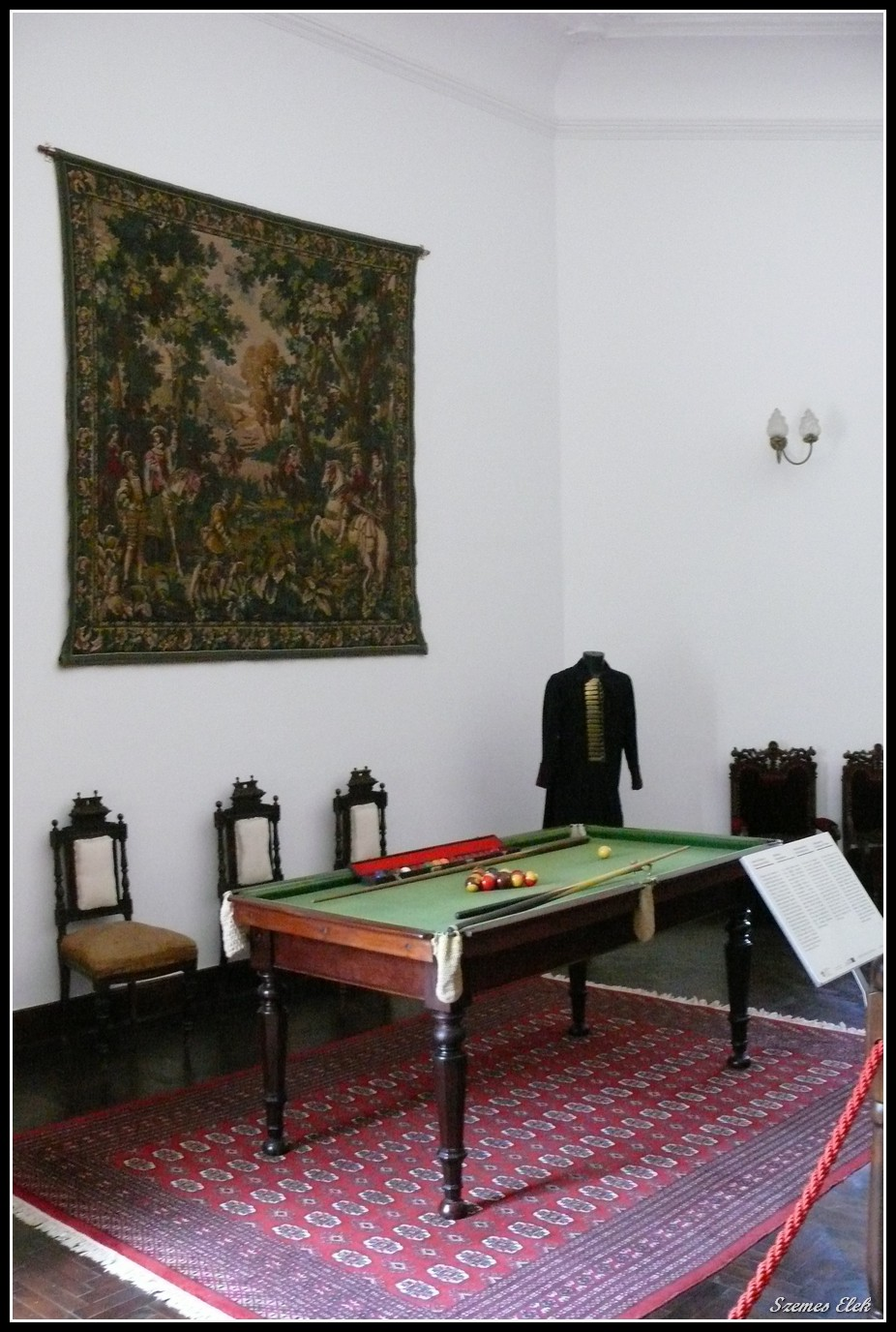

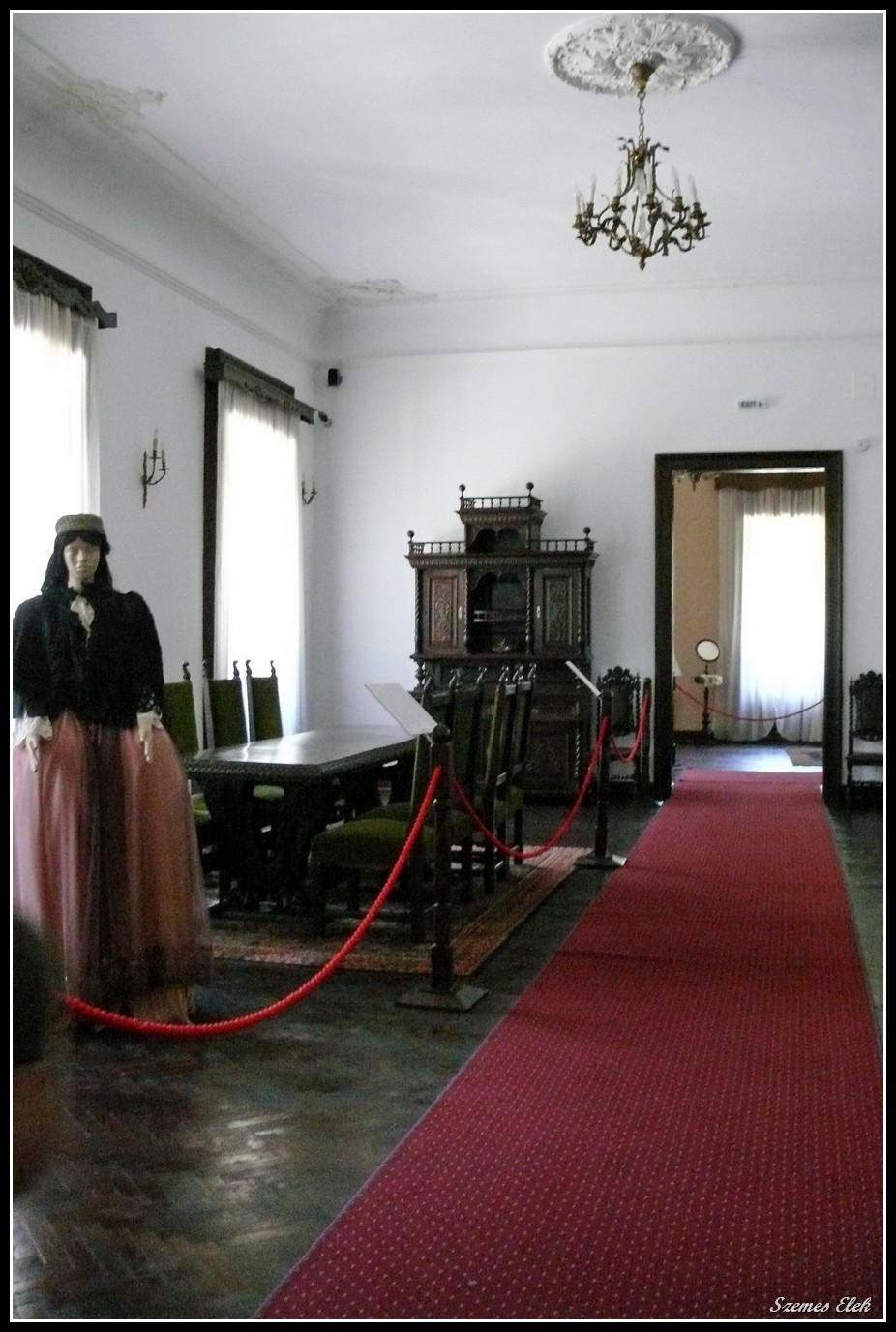

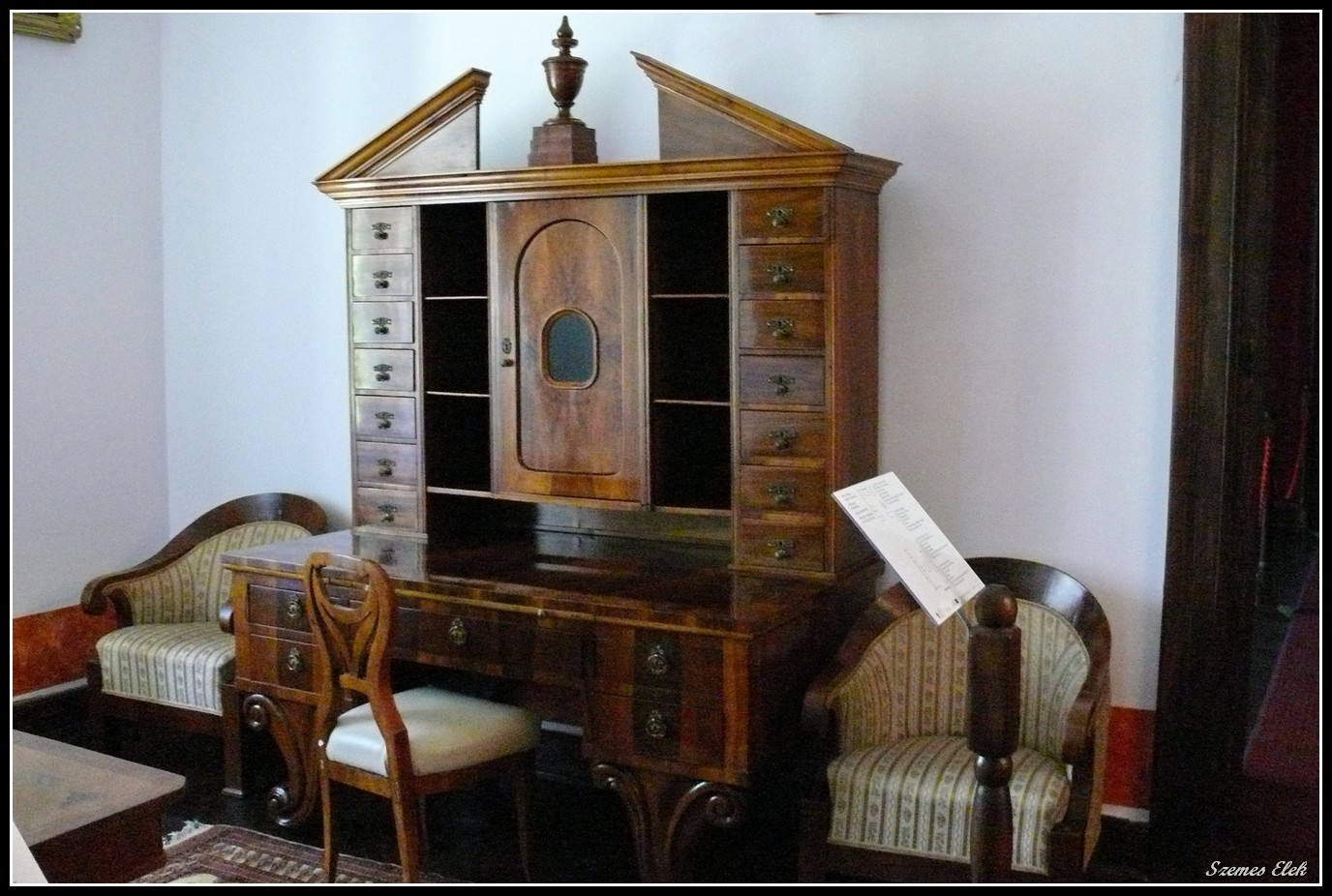

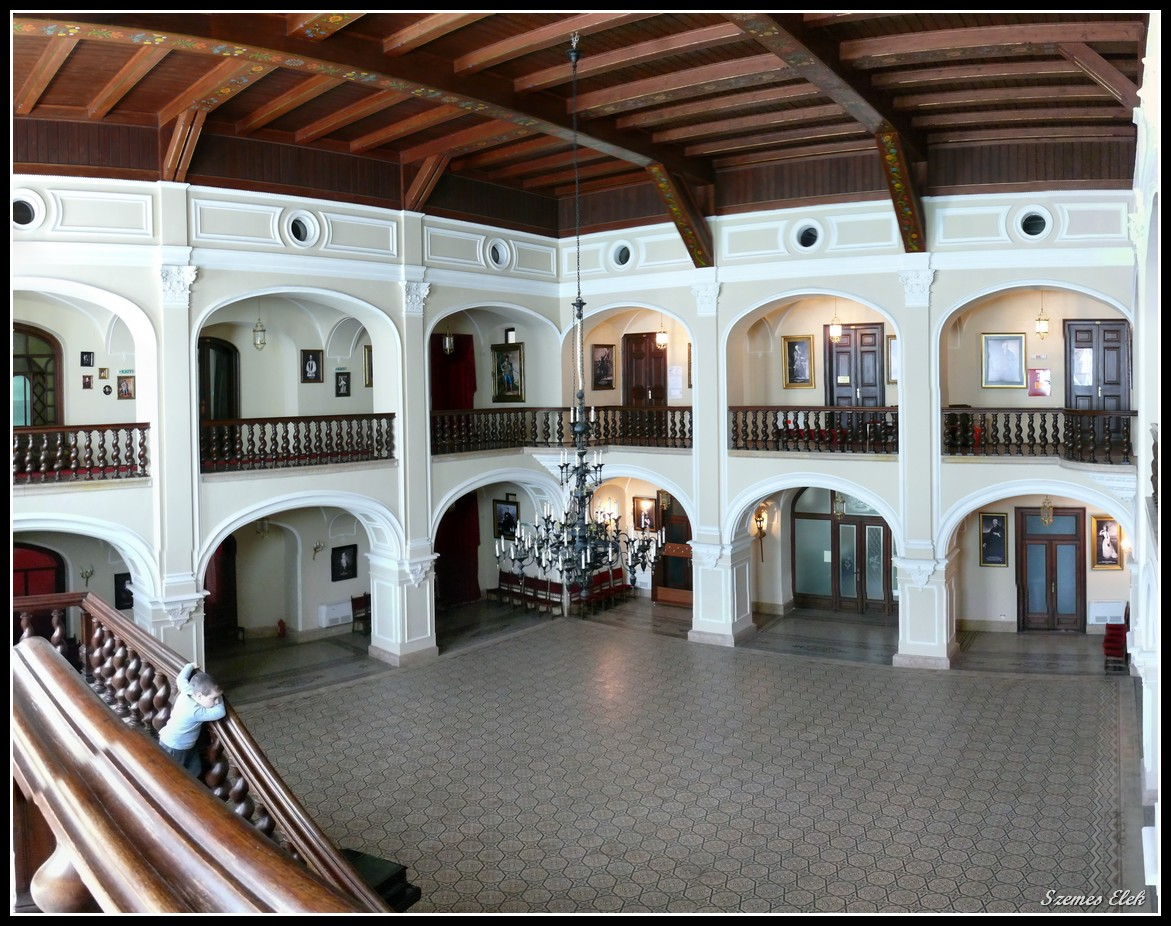
