= Arthur Meinig =

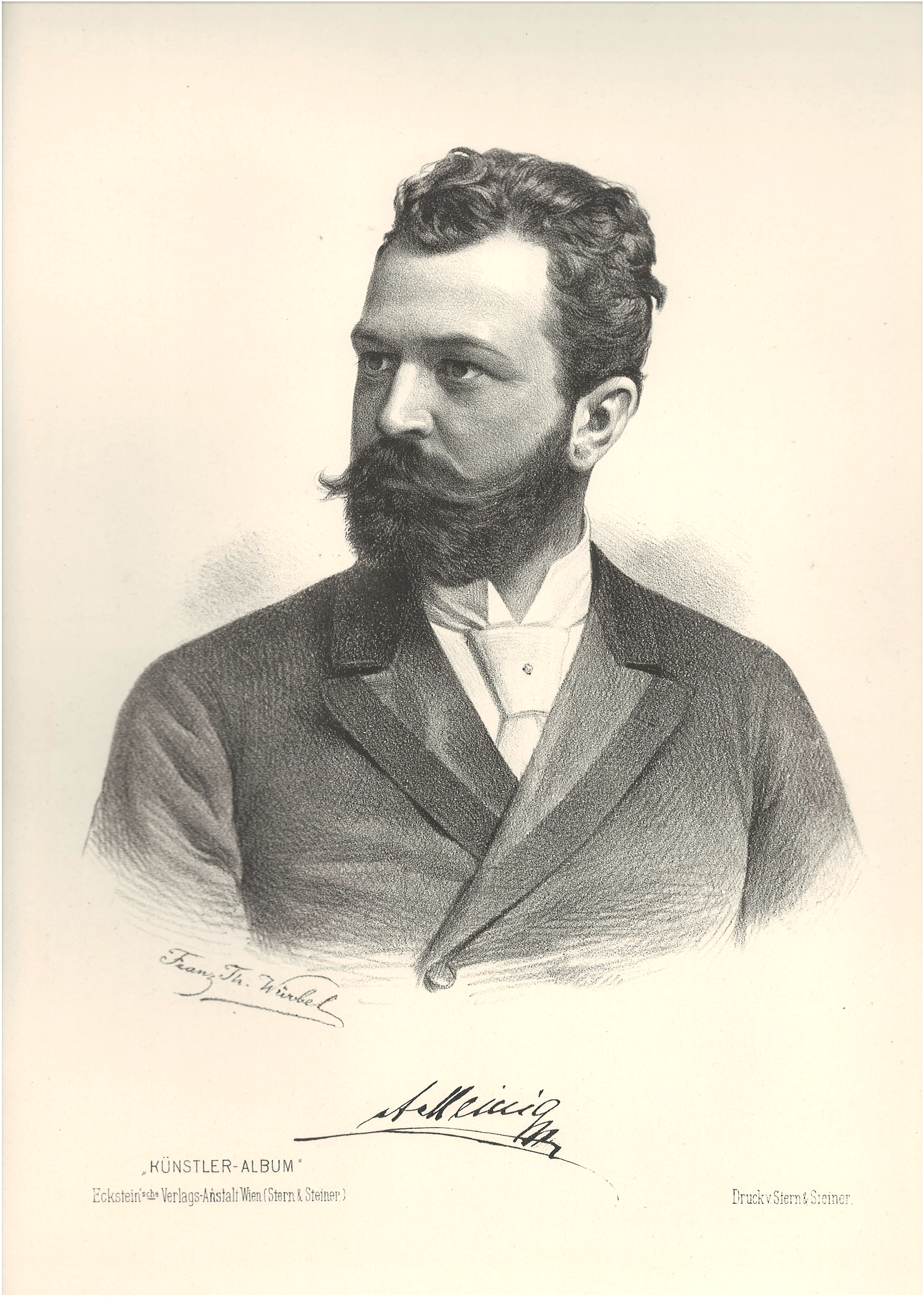
- Portrait of Arthur Meinig around 1883 (lithography by Franz Würbel)
- Born: Arthur Meinig; 7 November 1853; Waldheim, Saxony
- Died: 14 September 1904 (aged 50); Budapest, Austria-Hungary
- Education: TU Dresden, Dresden
- Occupation: Architect
- Spouse: Angela Babarczi-Schwartzer
- Practice: Ferdinand Fellner; Hermann Helmer
- Buildings: Andrássy Palace; Wenckheim Palace; Károlyi Castle

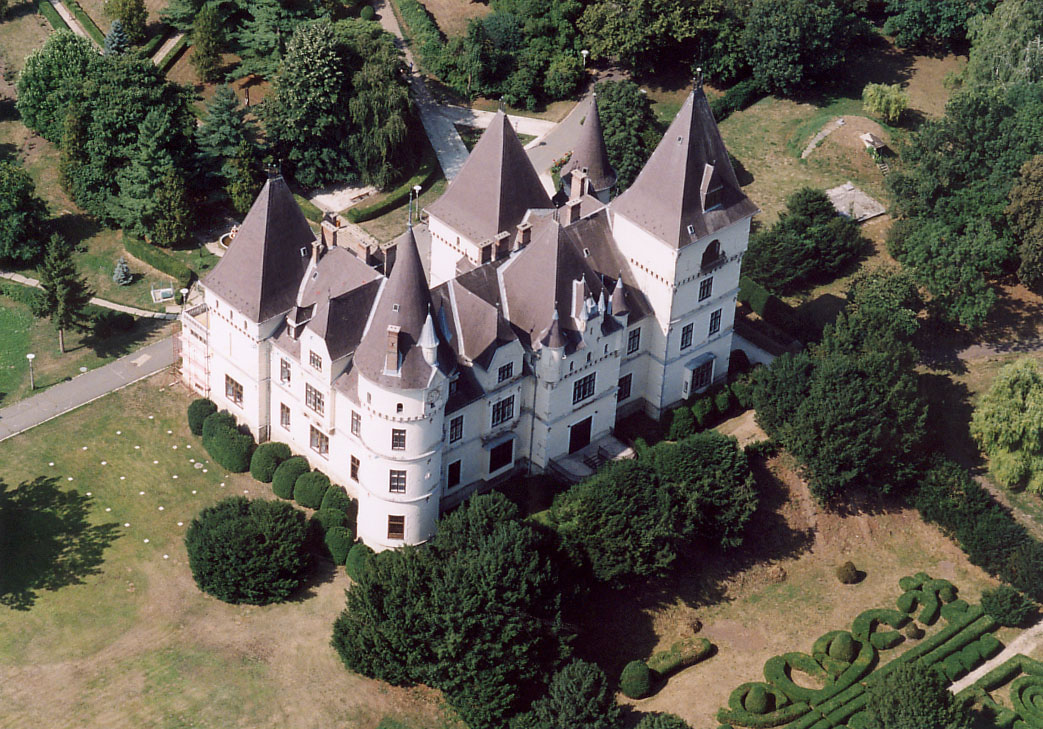
Andrássy Palace in Tiszadob from a bird's eye view

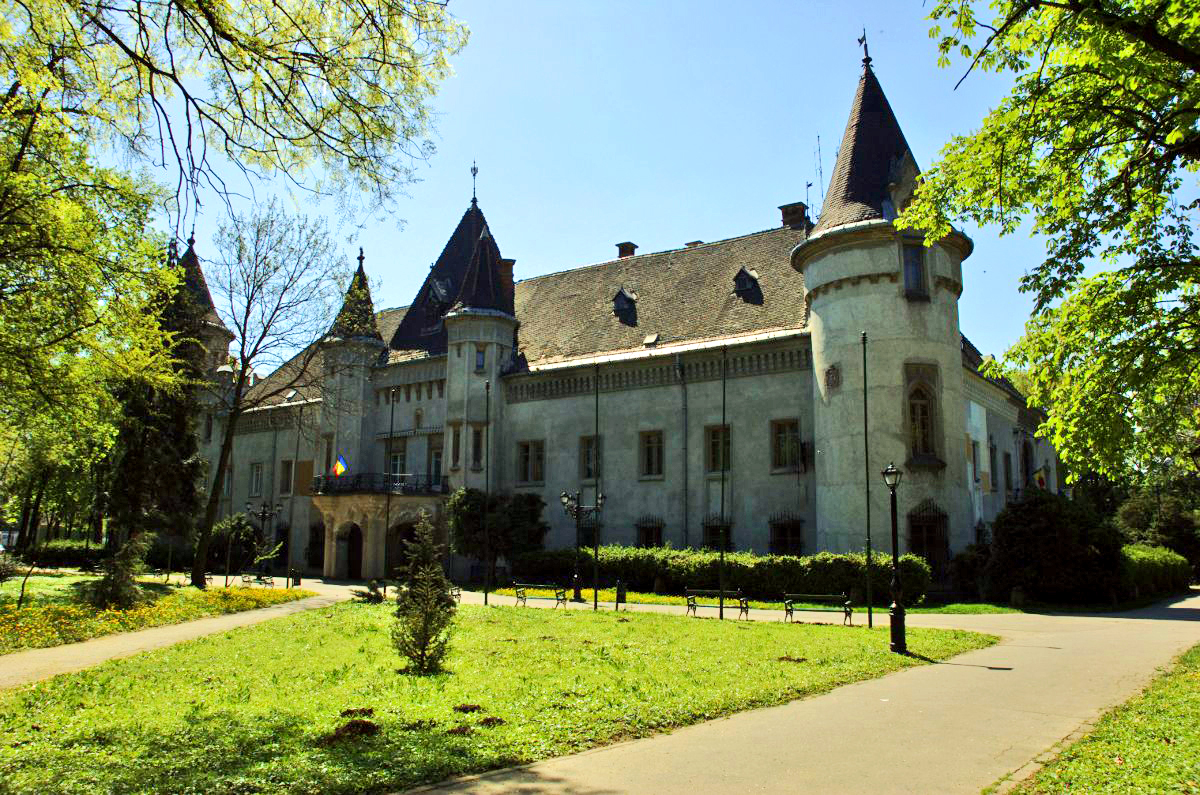
Károlyi Castle in Carei/Nagykároly

Arthur Meinig (Hungarian: Meinig Arthur) was a Kingdom of Saxony-born architect from Austria-Hungary. He was born in Waldheim, Saxony on 7 November 1853 and died in Budapest on 14 September 1904. After studying in Dresden, he worked for architects Fellner and Helmer in Vienna. In 1883 he moved to Budapest and soon became a favorite architect of the Hungarian nobility. Though especially known for his work in the Neobaroque style, he also used the Neo-Gothic, Neo-Renaissance and Châteauesque styles.

== Works ==
- Emmer Palace, Budapest, 1885–1887.
- Andrássy Palace, Tiszadob, Hungary, 1885-1886–1890.
- Wenckheim Palace (now Metropolitan Ervin Szabó Library), Budapest, 1886–1889.
- Mausoleum of the Andrássy Family, Trebišov, (Hungarian: Tőketerebes) now Slovakia, 1891–1893.

The Mausoleum is one of the most beautiful monuments in Trebišov. It was built in the neo-Gothic style by Arthur Meinig. The sarcophagus is a work of the Hungarian sculptor György Zala from the years 1893–1895. In the mausoleum there is buried the count Gyula Andrássy from 1894, the prime minister of Austria-Hungary (1867). In the sarcophagus there are relicts of his wife Katalin Andrássy. Above the sarcophagus there are two bronze cartouches with the signs of the count and his wife. Beside that there is the tinny coffin of Tódor Andrássy (1857–1905). Their souls are protected by the sculpture of an angel. Near the sarcophagus sorrows the bronze sculpture of Helena, the wife of the count Lajos Batthyány. In the interior there are the starry vault and the Neo-Gothic windows.

- Hunyady Palace, Budapest, 1892–1894.
- Csekonics Palace, Budapest, rebuilding 1893–1896.
- Park Club, Budapest, 1893–1895.
- Károlyi Castle, Carei, (Hungarian: Nagykároly) now Romania, rebuilding 1893–1896.
- Dungyerszky Palace, Budapest, 1899–1900.
- Adria Palace, Budapest, 1900–1902.
