= Sándor Károlyi =

Hungarian aristocrat, statesman and Imperial Feldmarschall

- Sándor Károlyi de Nagykároly
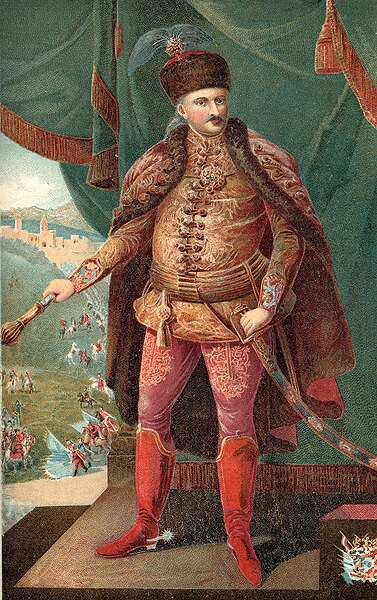
- Born: 20 March 1668; Nagykároly, Kingdom of Hungary
- Died: 8 September 1743 (aged 75); Erdőd, Kingdom of Hungary
- Spouse: Krisztina Barkóczy de Szala
- Children: Ferenc Károlyi
- Military career
- Allegiance: Habsburg monarchy (until 1703); Kingdom of Hungary (1703–1743)
- Rank: Generalfeldmarschall
- Other work: Treaty of Szatmár (1711); Lord Lieutenant, Szatmár County

Baron, later Count Sándor Károlyi de Nagykároly (German: Alexander Károly von Nagy-Károly; 20 March 1668 – 8 September 1743) was a Hungarian aristocrat, statesman and Imperial Feldmarschall. He was one of the generals of Francis II Rákóczi during the War of Independence. Later he negotiated the Treaty of Szatmár, which guaranteed autonomy to the Hungarian nobles.

== Early life ==
He was born in Nagykároly, Kingdom of Hungary (present-day Carei, Romania) on 20 March 1668, as a son of László Károlyi and his second wife, Erzsébet Sennyey. The Károly family is one of the oldest, richest, and most famous noble families of Hungary. The Károly castle with market towns and parishes is located in Upper Hungary beyond the Tisza, in Szatmár County.

== War with the Turks and Hungarian uprising ==
After the Battle of Vienna (1683), and the subsequent (and eventual) ejection of the Ottoman armies from the Principality of Transylvania in the Second Battle of Mohács in 1687, the disintegration of the Ottoman army while it crossed the Tisza river at the Battle of Zenta, allowed Imperial Habsburg armies to conquer large areas, including most of present-day Slavonia and Transylvania came under Imperial rule. On 9 December 1687 there was organized a Diet in Pressburg and Archduke Joseph was crowned as the first hereditary king of Hungary; future Habsburgs were declared to be the anointed kings of Hungary.

In 1691 Louis, Margrave of Baden-Baden, also called Türkenlouis, was returning from his Transylvanian victories and Károlyi rode to meet him, to pay his respects. Together they inspected a fortress at Szatmár in which the Margrave found fault with the fortifications. Its commander, General Loeffelholz, claimed that the fortifications were in disrepair because Karolyi had not furnished the requisite quota of labor. Károlyi told the Margrave that his county had redeemed its obligation in payment of hard cash. His speech was interpreted as signs of disrespect and rebelliousness, traits the Habsburg notables deplored in Hungarian nobles.

=== Uprising ===
Károlyi traveled to Vienna to negotiate with Imperial ministers over what he and other nobles deemed excessive taxation, conscription, and extraction of war contributions; his wife remained at the family estate. Imperial commanders threatened her with county-wide devastation unless she provided war contributions; she refused, and the Habsburg garrison of the family's primary fortress surrendered without consulting her or their Hungarian commanders. Károlyi's wife and daughter (Klára) were evicted from their home. On his return trip to his home, town after town controlled by Imperial War office refused him lodging. After a series of attempts to recover his property, locate his family, and complete negotiations for fairer extractions, he was pushed into rebellion with several other Hungarian nobles.

The Habsburg forces, fully engaged in the lengthy War of the Spanish Succession, did not have the additional military power to engage the nobles, but the Hungarian leadership had neither the financial resources nor the military ones, to defeat the Habsburg forces in Hungary. Throughout 1703–1706, the former Habsburg general wrought havoc in Moravia and Bohemia. The ongoing insurrection, in which Sándor Károlyi played a significant part, led to the deposition of the Habsburg king in Hungary in 1707. However, after victories at Blenheim and Turin, the Habsburgs were able to devote more resources against recalcitrant Hungarians. The uprising took a dramatic turn at the Battle of Trencsén, on 4 August 1708. Rákóczi was knocked off his horse; his troops thought he had been killed, and fled. Rákóczi fled to Poland.

=== Diplomacy ===
On 30 April 1711, with the Treaty of Szatmár, a group of Hungarian nobles led by Károlyi deserted its leader Rákóczi and recognized Habsburg rule. In turn, the Habsburgs recognized the traditional constitution and privileges of Hungary. Although the Hungarian claim over Transylvania was not confirmed, at least not positively, Vienna recognized the rights of Protestants, Hungarian autonomy (especially with regard to the taxation of landholders), and the Hungarian Diet was considered sacrosanct. The compromise was confirmed in the Pragmatic Sanction, although the rights of Protestants continued to be a contested issue well through the remainder of the century.

=== Later work ===
In 1719, he suppressed anti-Habsburg riots in the lands beyond the Tisz river. In 1741, the Hungarian nobility instigated unrest in the same region, and the Empress Maria Theresa appointed him as Field Marshal. He successfully quelled the unrest there.

== Family ==
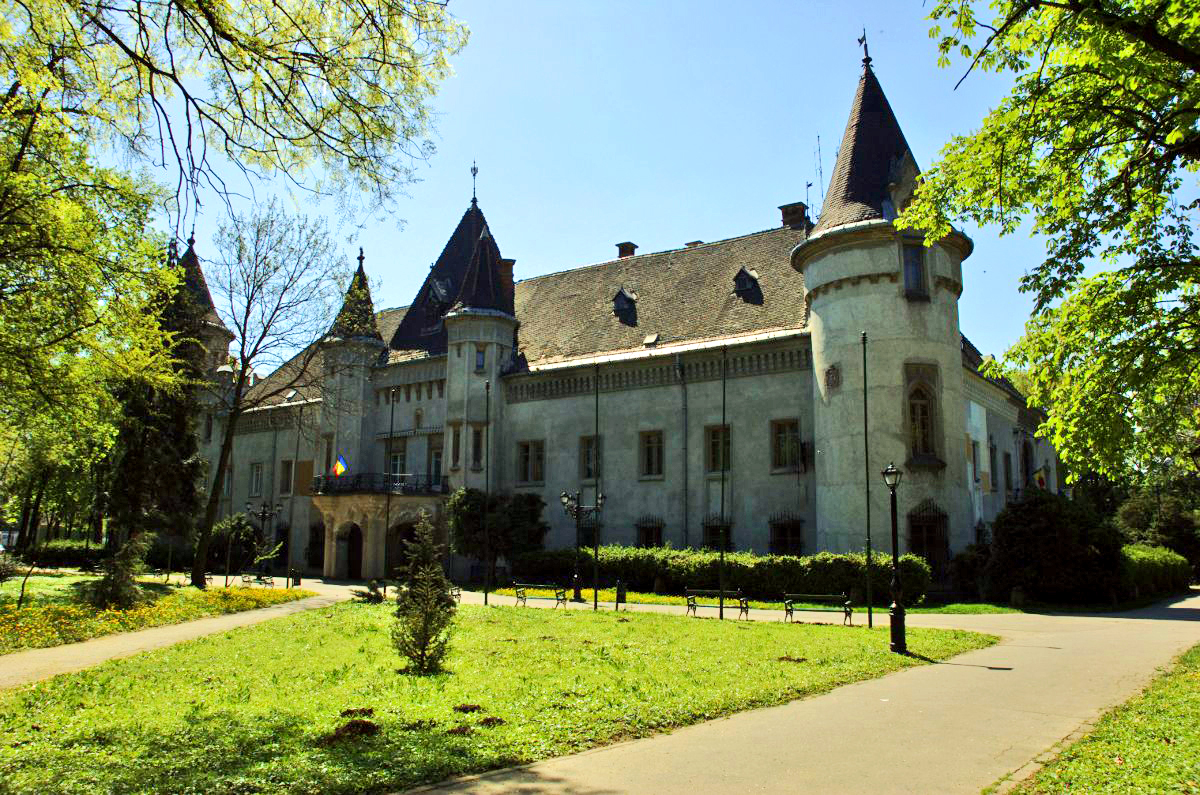
Károlyi castle

The Károlyi family dates from the thirteenth century, belonged to the clan Kaplon, with roots in the old families of Becsky, Komahidy, Bagossy and Kaplyon. Mihály (III) (1585–1626) and Erzsébet Perényi had several surviving children: Péter and Bertalan, who died young, and Mihály (IV) (1585–1626) and Zsuzsanna) (died 1621). Zsuzsanna married Baron Pál Esterházy. Mihály's son, László (died 28 February 1689) married first Judit Csapy, and second Erzsébet Sennyey. Sándor Károlyi was one of twenty siblings, of which he was the only male survivor. He and his wife, Countess Krisztina Barkóczy de Szala, had three children, Ferenc (1705–1758), who was a general of cavalry, Klára, and László, who died in 1702.

His son Ferenc or Franz (his only male survivor) commanded the Károlyi Hussar regiment on the Rhine in 1741.

== See also ==
- Rákóczi's War of Independence

== Sources ==
- Bromley, J. S. The New Cambridge Modern History. CUP Archive, 1976. Volume 6: The Rise of Great Britain and Russia. 1688–1715/25
- Hengelmueller, Ladislaus, Freiher von Iengevar, Hungary's Fight for National Existence, MacMillan 1913.
- Marczali, Henry. Hungary in the Eighteenth Century, Cambridge University Press, 2015 [1910].
- Prinz Eugen von Savoyen 1663–1736, CUP Archive, 1963.
- Taylor, A.J.P. The Habsburg Monarchy 1809–1918, University of Chicago Press, 1976.
- Wurzbach, Constant. Károly, die Grafen, BLKÖ, v11, pp. 1–2
