= Treaty of Szatmár =

1711 treaty ending Rákóczi's War of Independence

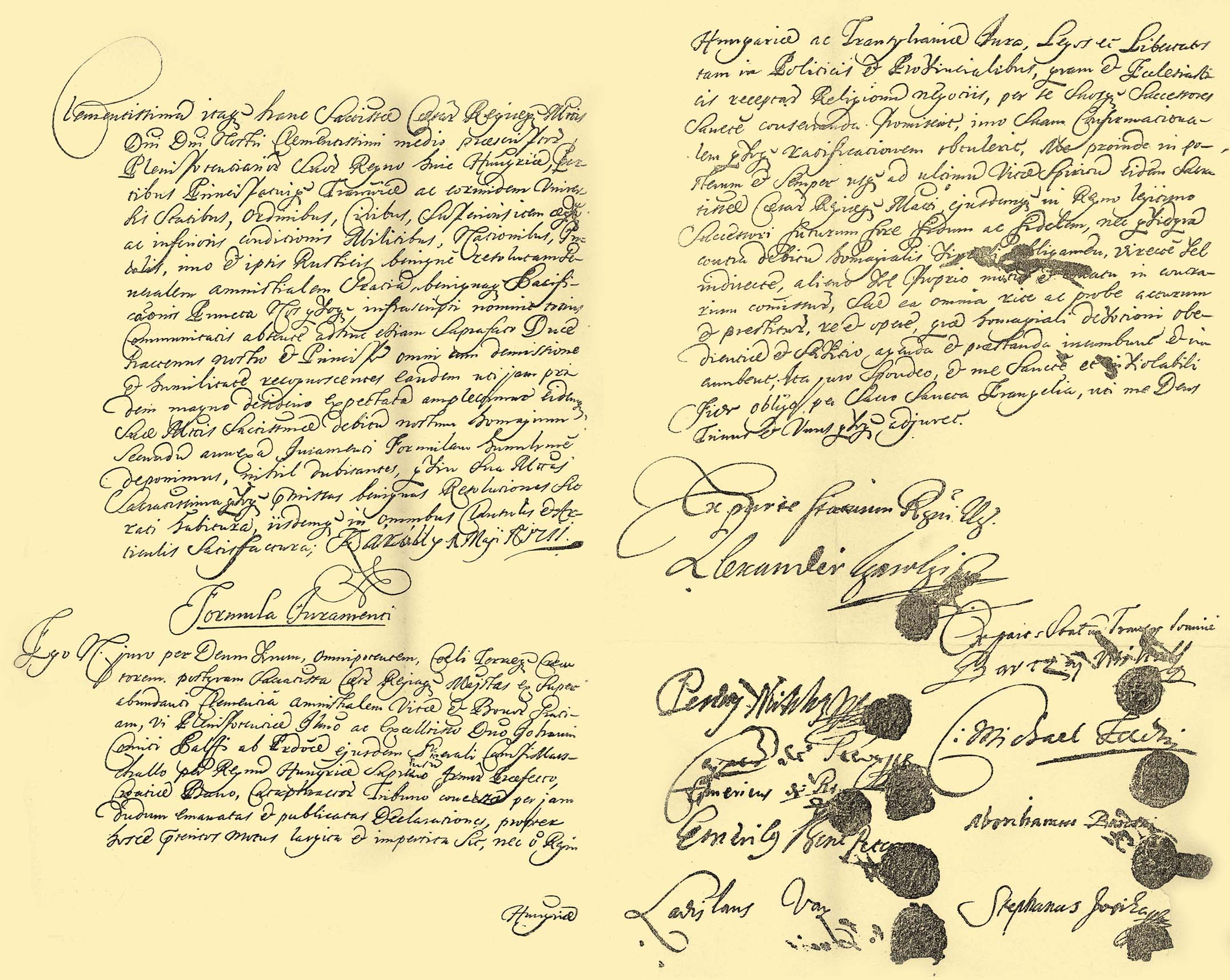
Contractual document, Austrian National Archives

The Treaty of Szatmár (or the Peace of Szatmár) was a peace treaty concluded at Szatmár (present-day Satu Mare, Romania) on 29 April 1711 between the House of Habsburg emperor Charles VI, the Hungarian estates and the Kuruc rebels. It formally ended Rákóczi's War of Independence, which had endured since 1703.

In the Great Turkish War, the forces of the Habsburg monarchy conquered large parts of Ottoman Hungary. However, the new rulers soon met with resistance by the Hungarian magnates led by Francis II Rákóczi, culminating in the rebellion led by Rákóczi, which from 1703 onwards spread throughout Upper Hungary (today mostly Slovakia), Transylvania and Carpathian Ruthenia. The rebels were decisively defeated by a Habsburg army under Field marshal Sigbert Heister, backed by Rascian forces, in the 1708 Battle of Trencsén. As the conflict rumbled on, the Hofkriegsrat president Prince Eugene of Savoy appointed the loyal Hungarian Field Marshal János Pálffy chief negotiator. In November 1710, Pálffy contacted the Kuruc commander Sándor Károlyi and achieved a truce on 13 January 1711.

Pálffy and Rákóczi met in Vaja on 31 January; however, Rákóczi rejected the provided peace conditions. On 21 February, he left for Poland to seek support from the envoys of Tsar Peter the Great, who nevertheless was involved in the Great Northern War. He appointed Sándor Károlyi commander-in-chief of the remaining Kuruc strongholds and explicitly forbade any further peace negotiations. Károlyi ignored the order and convoked an insurgents' assembly at Szatmár, which on 4 April resolved upon preliminary peace conditions and ordered a ceasefire.

On 17 April, the Habsburg Emperor Joseph I died and was succeeded by his brother Charles VI, who had a vital interest in the cessation of military action in order to obtain the Hungarian crown. His envoys arrived in Szatmár, where Field Marshal János Pálffy and Sándor Károlyi soon reached an agreement. The furious rebel leader Rákóczi himself turned up and refused any concessions; however, he could no longer prevail and returned to Poland. The signing ceremony was held on 1 May 1711 by Pálffy, Károlyi together with numerous Imperial, Hungarian, Kuruc and Transylvanian envoys. They had left Szatmár for Poland. Based on the terms of the accord, Emperor Charles promised to maintain the integrity of both Transylvanian and Hungarian estates. Moreover, the accord granted the Kuruc insurgents general amnesty. The impact of the treaty was evident on 1 May 1711, when 12,000 former advocates of Rákóczi swore allegiance to the House of Habsburg in the fields outside of Majtény in Szatmár.

== Terms ==
- A comprehensive amnesty was extended to all participants, granting full royal pardon to both the rank and file and the leadership of the insurrection.
- The nobility were secured in their ancestral prerogatives and immunities, contingent upon a formal oath of fealty to the House of Habsburg.
- The peasantry were guaranteed the preservation of their existing liberties and customary exemptions.
- Solemn assurances were provided for the free exercise of religion, upholding the principles of confessional toleration.
- The Crown pledged to uphold the constitutional integrity and the traditional status and statehood of both the Kingdom of Hungary and the Principality of Transylvania.
- The Sovereign undertook the regular convocation of the parliament, ensuring the continued legislative participation of the Estates.
- The new alien institutions and dignities deemed injurious to the traditional standing of the Hungarian Estates were suppressed.

== See also ==
- List of treaties
