= Esterházy Palace =

Esterházy Palace or Esterházy Castle may refer to:

- Eszterháza, a palace in Fertőd, Hungary
- Esterházy Palace (Bratislava), a palace in Bratislava, Slovakia
- Palais Esterházy, a palace in Vienna, Austria
- Palais Esterházy (Kärntner Straße), a palace in Vienna, Austria
- Schloss Esterházy, a palace in Eisenstadt, Austria
- Schloss Esterhazy (Galanta), a chateau in Galanta, Slovakia

== See also ==
- Palais Esterházy (disambiguation)
- Schloss Esterházy (disambiguation)
