= Palais Esterházy (disambiguation) =

Palais Esterházy an der Wallnerstraße is a baroque palace in Vienna (location of the Esterházykeller restaurant).

Palais Esterházy may also refer to:

- Palais Esterházy an der Kärntner Straße in Vienna (location of Casino Wien)
- Palais Esterházy an der Krugerstraße in Vienna (later Palais Erdődy; demolished around 1955)
- Palais Esterházy in Bratislava, Slovakia (location of the Slovak National Gallery)

== See also ==
- Esterházy Palace
- Schloss Esterházy
