= Galanta =

Galanta Galánta (Hungarian)
- Municipality
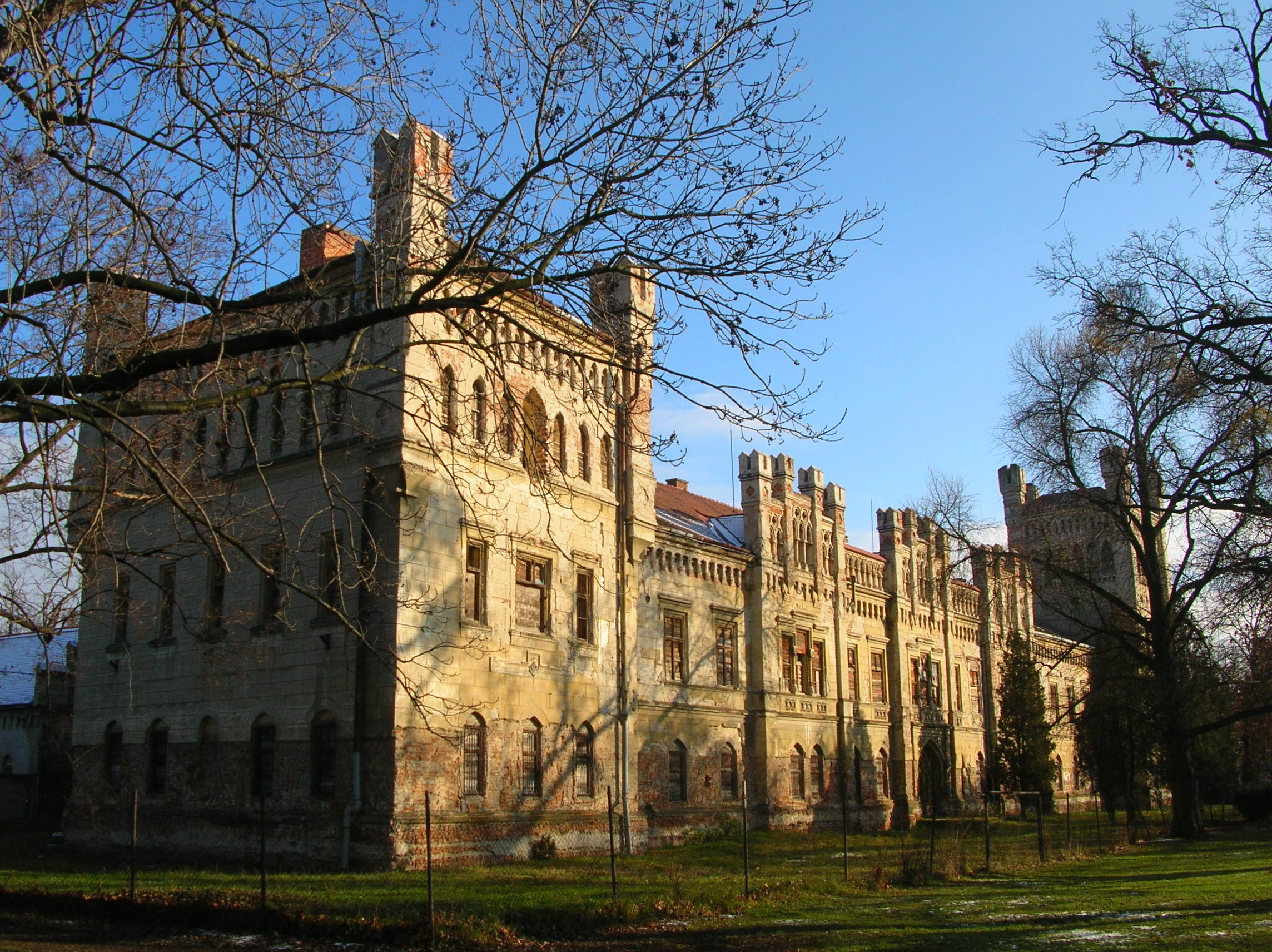
- Neo-Gothic castle

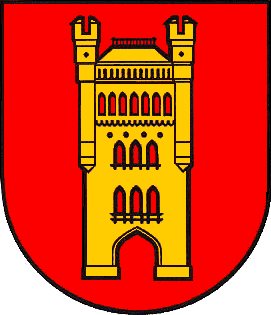
- Flag Coat of arms

- Location of Galanta in the Trnava Region Location of Galanta in Slovakia
- Coordinates: 48.19°N 17.73°E
- Country: Slovakia
- Region: Trnava Region
- District: Galanta District
- First mentioned: 1237

Government
  - Mayor: Mgr. Peter Kolek

Area
  - Total: 34.03 km^{2} (13.14 sq mi)
- Elevation: 119 m (390 ft)

Population (2025)
  - Total: 15,402
- Time zone: UTC+1 (CET)
  - Summer (DST): UTC+2 (CEST)
- Postal code: 924 01
- Area code: +421 31
- Vehicle registration plate (until 2022): GA
- Website: www.galanta.sk

Galanta (Hungarian: Galánta, German: Gallandau) is a town with about 15,000 inhabitants in the Trnava Region of Slovakia. It is situated 50 km due east of the Slovak capital Bratislava.

== Etymology ==
The name is derived from a Slavic name Golęta (initially a collective name of a youth group selected from a kin and responsible for guarding). A pre-Hungarian origin of the settlement is documented by the Proto-Slavic nasal "ę" conserved in the name (GalaNta; compare with Czech Holetín and Holetice).

== Geography ==
The municipality lies at an altitude of 119 metres (390 ft) and covers an area of 34.03 km^{2} (13.14 sq mi) (2025).

Galanta lies in the Danubian Lowland (Podunajská nížina), the warm southern part of Slovakia. There are many agricultural fields around Galanta, where wheat, corn, and other vegetables and fruits are grown.

== History ==
The area around Galanta has been inhabited almost continuously since the Neolithic. From the second half of the 10th century until 1918, it was part of the Kingdom of Hungary. The first written record of Galanta is from 1237 in a Royal Decree by Béla IV of Hungary. Through the years, the settlement was under the lordship of various noble families including the Esterházy de Galantha and the Fekete de Galántha.

Beginning in 1421, the Eszterházy family ruled the town and the surrounding area. In 1613 or 1614, Galanta was promoted to a free market town. Before the establishment of independent Czechoslovakia in 1918, Galanta was part of Pozsony County. After the break-up of Austria-Hungary in 1918/1920, the town became part of the newly created Czechoslovakia. As a result of the First Vienna Award, it returned to Hungary between 1938 and 1945. On 31 March 1945, Galanta was captured by troops of the Soviet 2nd Ukrainian Front and became again part of Czechoslovakia.

== Population ==
Historical population
Year	Pop.	±%
1970	8,954	—
1980	13,217	+47.6%
1991	16,978	+28.5%
2001	16,365	−3.6%
2011	15,138	−7.5%
2021	15,052	−0.6%
Source: Censuses

Population statistic (10 years)
Year	1995	2005	2015	2025
Count	16,763	15,873	15,021	15,402
Difference		−5.30%	−5.36%	+2.53%

Population statistic
Year	2024	2025
Count	15,358	15,402
Difference		+0.28%

It has a population of 15,402 people (31 December 2025).

In 1910, 89.6% of the population reported Hungarian as primary language, 6.2% Slovak, 3.5% German or Yiddish. The religious make-up was 65.3% Roman Catholic, 32.4% Jewish and 1.3% Lutheran.

=== Ethnicity ===
Census 2021 (1+ %)
Ethnicity	Number	Fraction
Slovak	9788	65.02%
Hungarian	4519	30.02%
Not found out	1213	8.05%
Total	15,052	

In year 2021 was 15,052 people by ethnicity 9788 as Slovak, 4519 as Hungarian, 1213 as Not found out, 101 as Czech, 72 as Romani, 54 as Other, 31 as Ukrainian, 25 as Vietnamese, 18 as Russian, 17 as Jewish, 17 as Serbian, 17 as Romanian, 14 as German, 13 as Polish, 7 as Bulgarian, 6 as Rusyn, 5 as Croatian, 4 as Italian, 4 as Korean, 3 as Moravian, 2 as Austrian, 2 as Canadian, 2 as English, 2 as Albanian and 1 as French.

Note on population: The difference values of population numbers in the table "Population statistic" and in the sections "Ethnicity" & "Religion" is caused by the use of various statistical methods.

=== Religion ===
Census 2021 (1+ %)
Religion	Number	Fraction
Roman Catholic Church	7484	49.72%
None	4910	32.62%
Not found out	1309	8.7%
Evangelical Church	613	4.07%
Total	15,052	

In year 2021 was 15,052 people by religion 7484 from Roman Catholic Church, 4910 from None, 1309 from Not found out, 613 from Evangelical Church, 141 from Calvinist Church, 109 from Christian Congregations in Slovakia, 104 from Greek Catholic Church, 68 from Apostolic Church, 58 from Other and not ascertained christian church, 42 from Ad hoc movements, 35 from Other, 30 from Buddhism, 28 from Eastern Orthodox Church, 25 from Jewish community, 24 from Jehovah's Witnesses, 21 from United Methodist Church, 17 from Islam, 12 from Paganism and natural spirituality, 7 from Hinduism, 6 from Old Catholic Church, 3 from Baptists Church, 2 from Seventh-day Adventist Church, 1 from Czechoslovak Hussite Church, 1 from Church of the Brethren, 1 from Church of Jesus Christ of Latter-day Saints and 1 from Bahá'i Community.

== Features ==
Galanta is an old town, but most historic buildings were damaged or destroyed in World War II. During the Communist era of Czechoslovakia (1948–1989), the architecture of the town further deteriorated as historic buildings were razed and replaced by prefabricated concrete apartment complexes and other buildings.

There are two important historic buildings that remain. The first one is the Esterházys' Neo-Gothic castle, and the second one is the Renaissance castle (the two are often referred to as manor houses rather than castles). The Esterházys' Neo-Gothic castle is in a state of disrepair and has been closed to the public since the late 1980s. The Renaissance castle was renovated in the 1990s and is being used as a museum, exhibition space and cultural center.

== Notable citizens ==
The Hungarian composer Zoltán Kodály spent most of his childhood in this town and composed the Dances of Galánta (1933, for orchestra) based on the folk music of this region.

The Czechoslovak Singer Karol Duchoň was born in this town, and attended the local elementary school. He left his hometown around 1965 to attend high school elsewhere.

== Famous people ==
- František Valábek (*1907 – † 1980), SDB, Roman Catholic priest end religious prisoner (sentenced to 6 years in prison).
- Karol Duchoň (*1950 – †1985), Singer.

== Twin towns — sister cities ==
Galanta is twinned with:

- Albignasego, Italy (2007)
- Mikulov, Czech Republic (2003)
- Paks, Hungary (1998)
- Tótkomlós, Hungary (1999)
- Kecskemét, Hungary (1998)
- Liptovský Mikuláš, Slovakia (2006)
- Bečej, Serbia (2001)
