= Tomáš Janovic =

Slovak writer (1937–2023)

- Born: 22 May 1937; Bratislava, Czechoslovakia
- Died: 14 December 2023 (aged 86); Bratislava, Slovakia
- Education: Comenius University
- Occupations: Writer, songwriter, journalist
- Writing career
- Language: Slovak
- Notable awards: Pribina Cross

Tomáš Janovic (22 May 1937 – 14 December 2023) was a Slovak writer, songwriter, journalist and poet. He was best known as an aphorist.

== Biography ==
Tomáš Janovic was born on 22 May 1937 in Bratislava in a nonobservant Jewish family. His father was a government official. During the World War II, the family faced persecution because of their Jewish heritage and had to hide in a hut in the woods close to the village of Čierny Balog.

Janovic was educated at a grammar school in Košice and studied Slovak language and history at the Comenius University. After his graduation in 1960 he joined the editorial team of the satirical weekly Roháč, where he remained until 1991. From then until his death, he was an independent writer, contributing typically short aphorisms to various newspapers and magazines.

Following the Velvet Revolution, Janovic was often the target of ire of nationalists due to his Jewish background and liberal, cosmopolitan worldview. The most severe incident happened in 2012 when Janovic and his wife were beaten by the nationalist writer Drahoslav Machala at a post office. The case was prominently featured in the media because Machala was an advisor and speechwriter of the prime minister Robert Fico and president Ivan Gašparovič. Machala denied the attack happened, but his guilt was proven by a camera recording. He was administratively sentenced for public disturbance and had to pay a fine.

== Literary career ==
Janovic started publishing predominantly short forms in Roháč already as a student in 1954. In 1959 he published his first book of poems Život je biely houb. In 1973, he received the Bratislava lyre award for lyrics of the song Chvála humoru performed by Karol Duchoň and Eva Kostolányiová. For nearly the entirety of his career, he closely cooperated with and wrote texts for the actors Milan Lasica and Július Satinský. In addition, he was well known as an author of radio plays for children and young adults.

In 2017 Janovic was awarded Pribina Cross, 2nd class by the president Andrej Kiska for his lifelong contributions to Slovak literature and development of democracy and human rights in Slovakia.

== Personal life and death ==
Janovic lived his entire adult life in Bratislava. He died on 14 December 2023, at the age of 86. After his death, many Slovak writers as well as the minister of culture Martina Šimkovičová paid homage to his life.
