= Schloss Esterházy (disambiguation) =

Schloss Esterházy is a palace in Eisenstadt, Austria.

Schloss Esterházy may also refer to:

- Schloss Esterházy in Fertőd, Hungary (also known as Eszterháza)
- Schloss Esterhazy in Galanta, Slovakia

== See also ==
- Esterházy Palace
- Palais Esterházy
