= Casinos Austria =

Austria-based gaming corporation

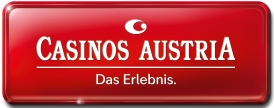
Logo of Casinos Austria

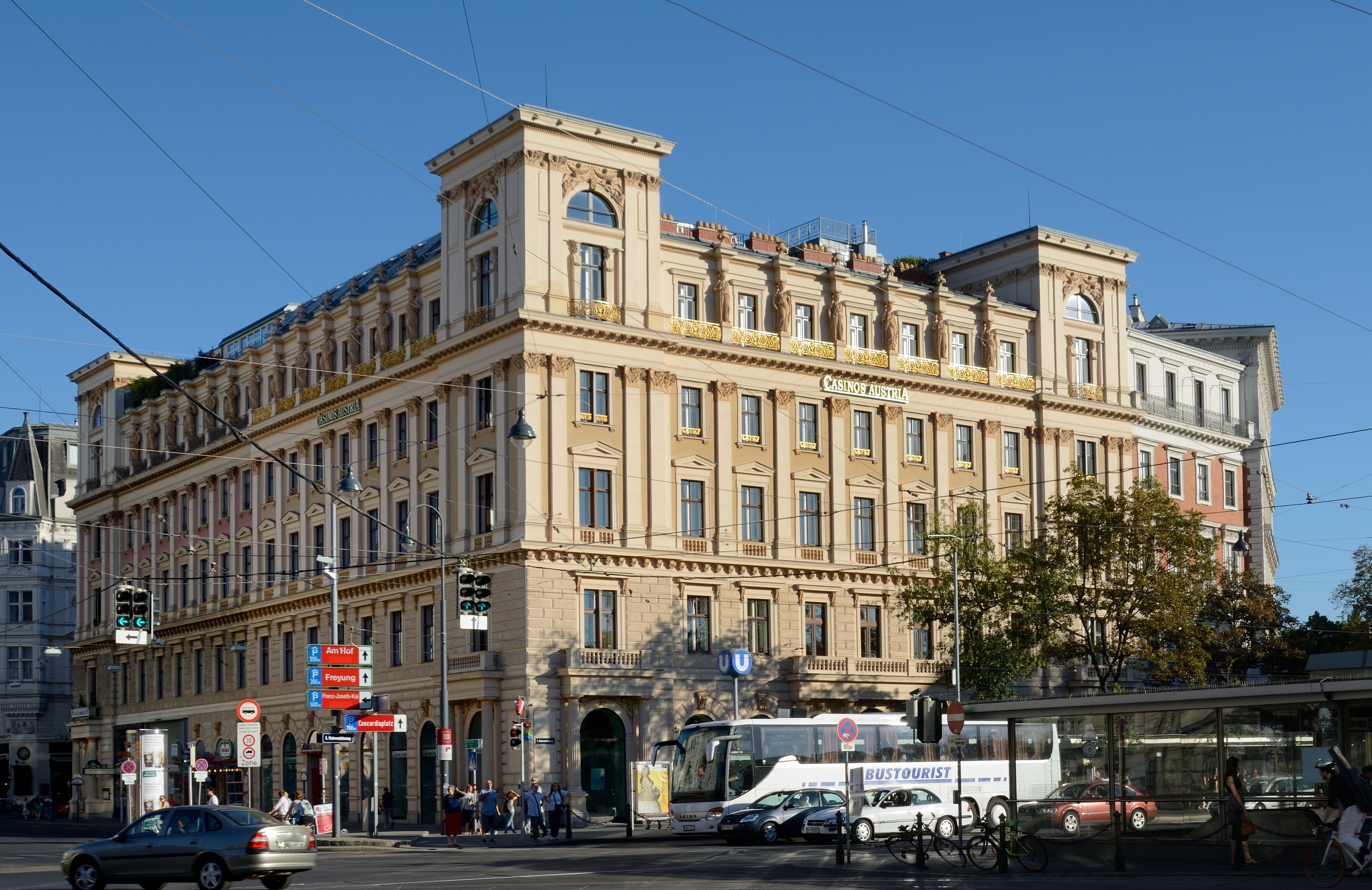
Former headquarters of Casinos Austria in Vienna (at Palais Ephrussi)

Casinos Austria AG, founded in 1967 and based in Vienna, Austria, is a gaming company that owns and operates casinos around the globe. It is one of the largest casino operators in the world. Casinos Austria and its partners operate in about 40 land-based casinos in 16 countries, 8 shipboard casinos, 15 slot parlors, a range of lottery products in Argentina, and an online gambling platform.

Together, the Casinos Austria International (CAI) group's gaming entertainment operations feature over 750 gaming tables and 7,600 gambling machines. The headquarters of the company was located in the Palais Ephrussi in Vienna from 1969 to 2009. It is now located at Rennweg 44 in the 3rd district of Vienna.

== Casinos Austria ==
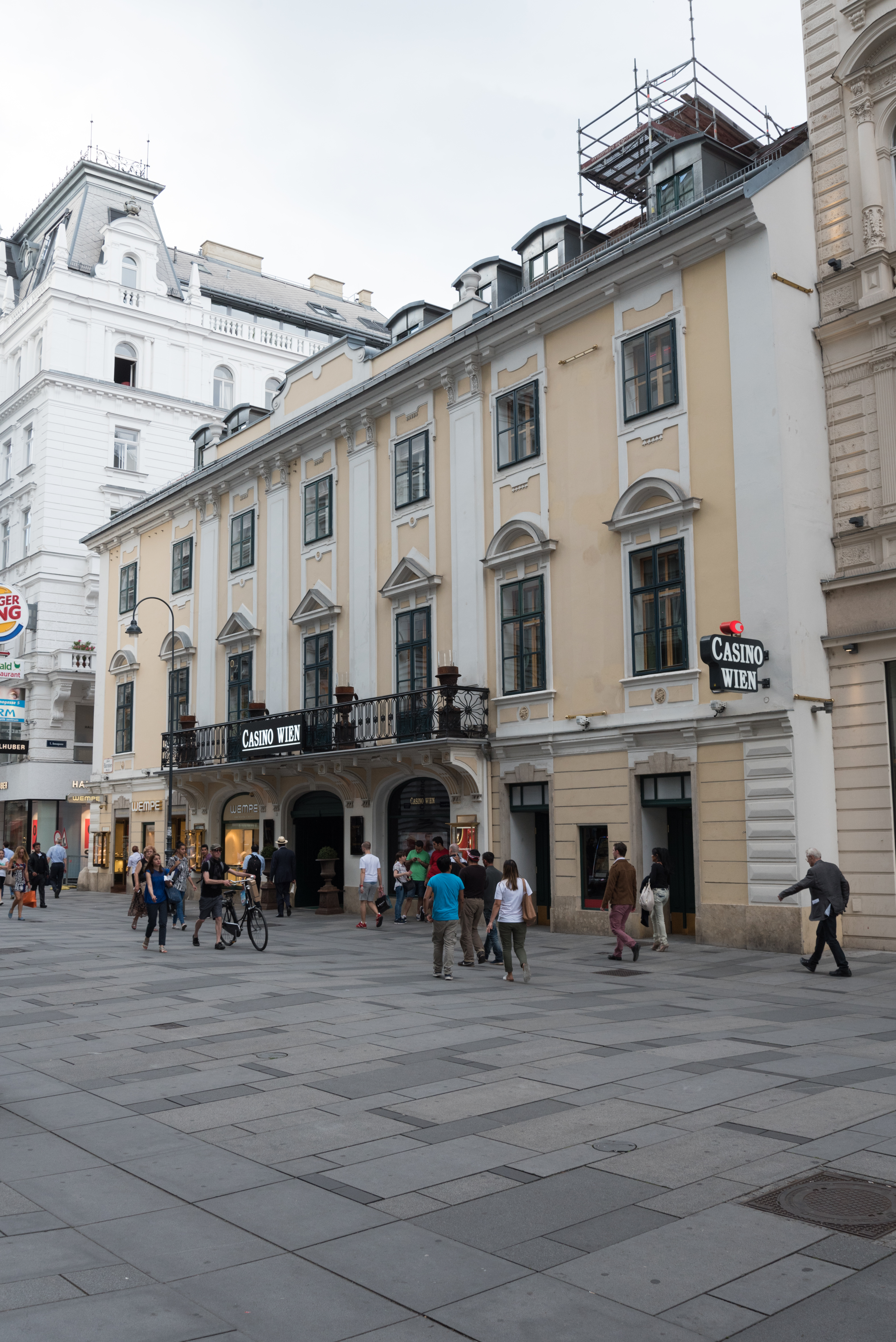
Casino Wien at Palais Esterházy, Vienna

- Casino Baden
- Casino Bad Gastein
- Casino Bregenz
- Casino Graz
- Casino Innsbruck
- Casino Kitzbühel
- Casino Kleinwalsertal
- Casino Linz
- Casino Salzburg (at Schloss Klessheim)
- Casino Seefeld
- Casino Velden
- Casino Wien (at Palais Esterházy)
- Casino Zell am See

== Casinos Austria International ==
- Casino Canberra, Canberra, Australia
- Grand Casino Belgrade
- Grand Casino Brussels (opened January 19, 2006)
- Grand Casino Luzern
- The Reef Hotel Casino, Cairns, Australia

== Gallery ==
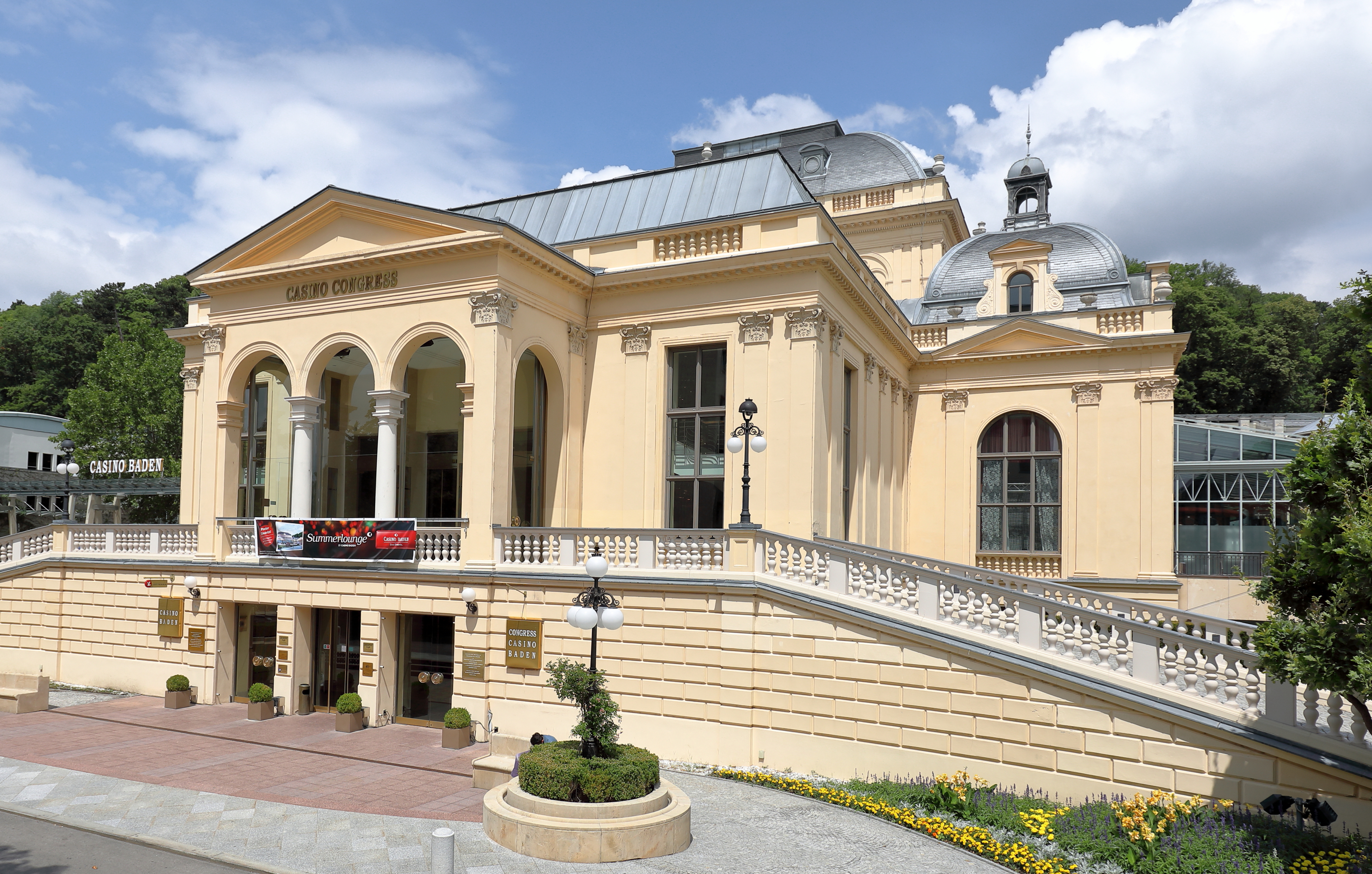
Casino Baden

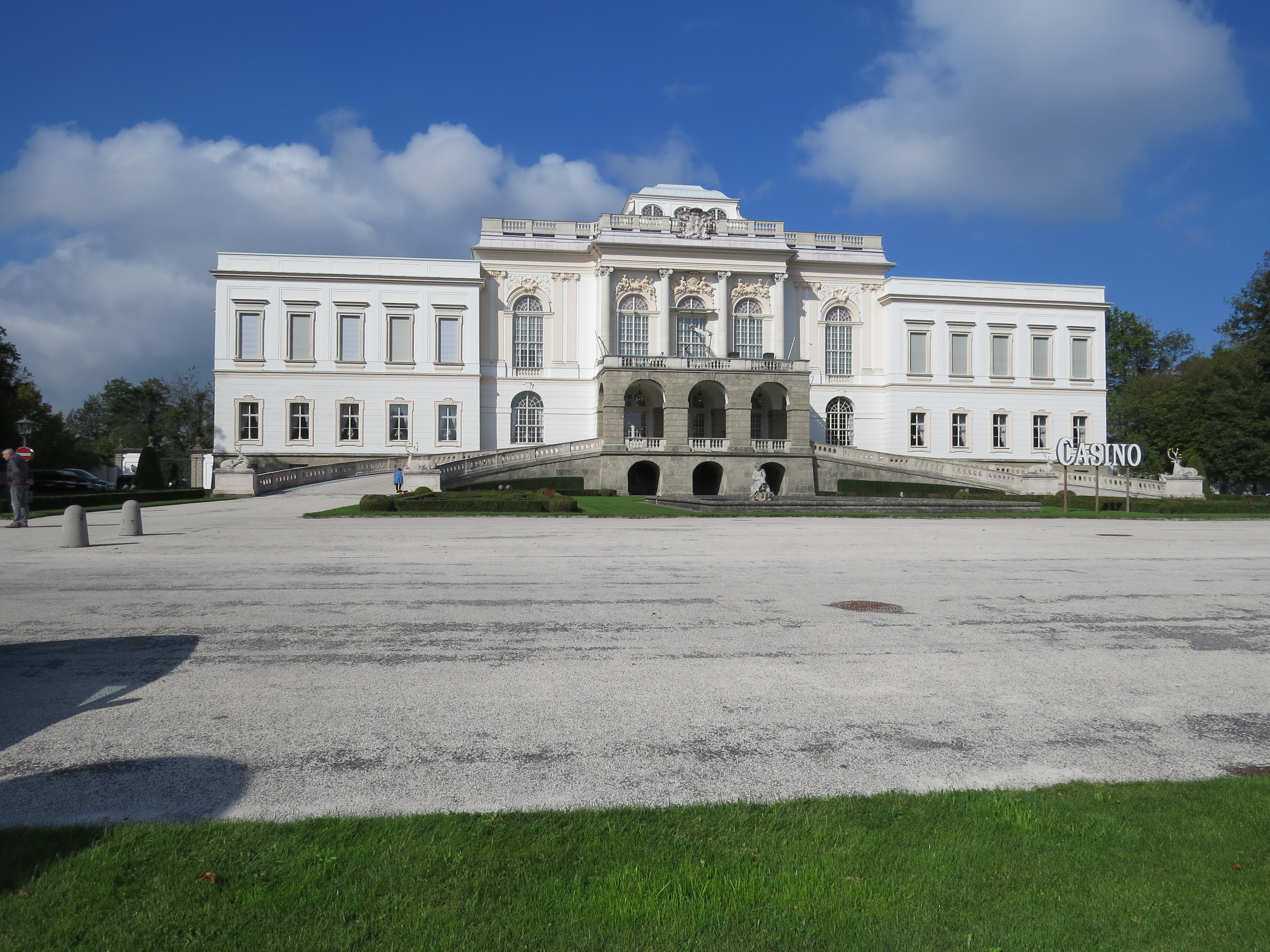
Casino Salzburg at Schloss Klessheim

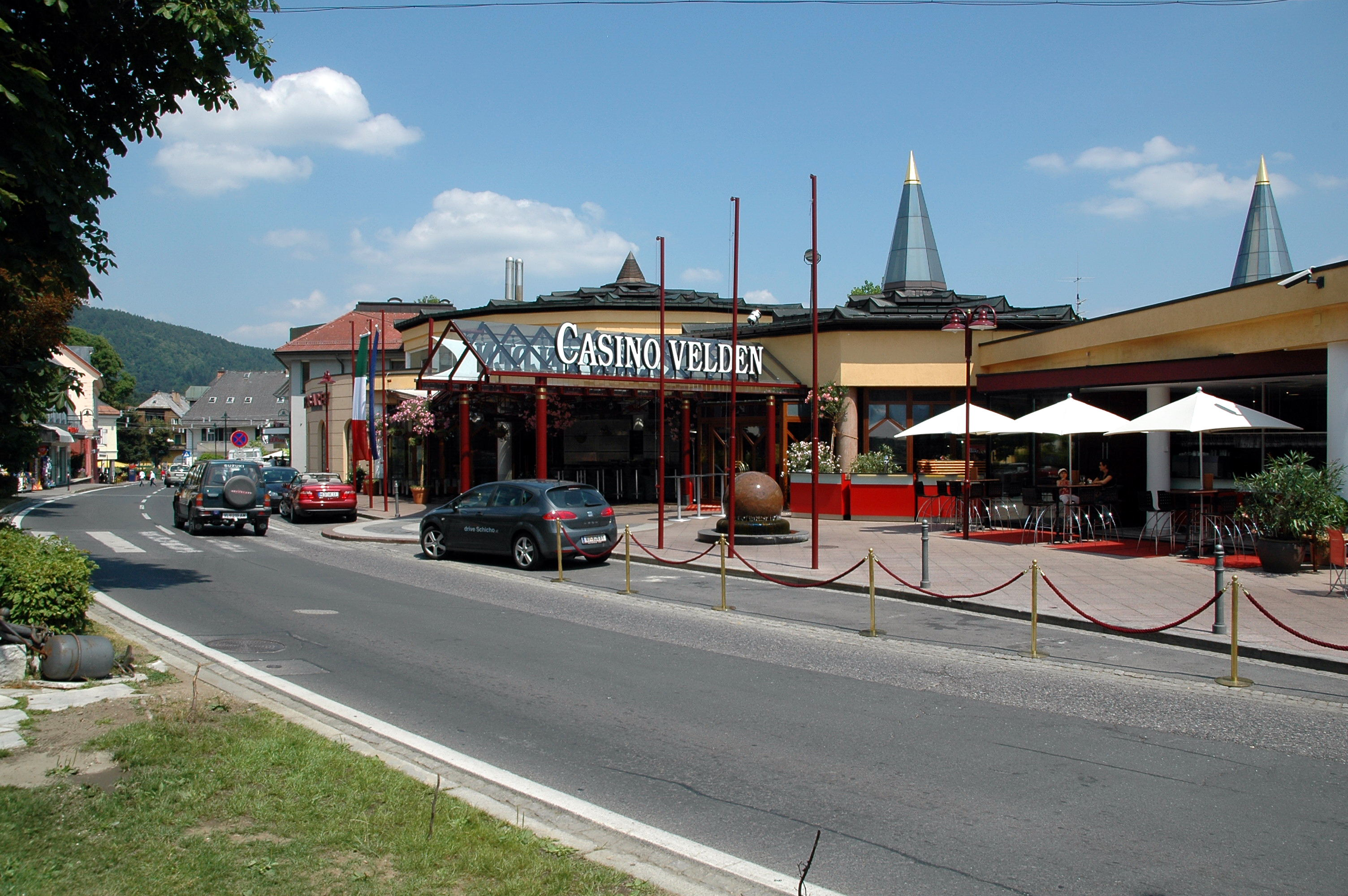
Casino Velden

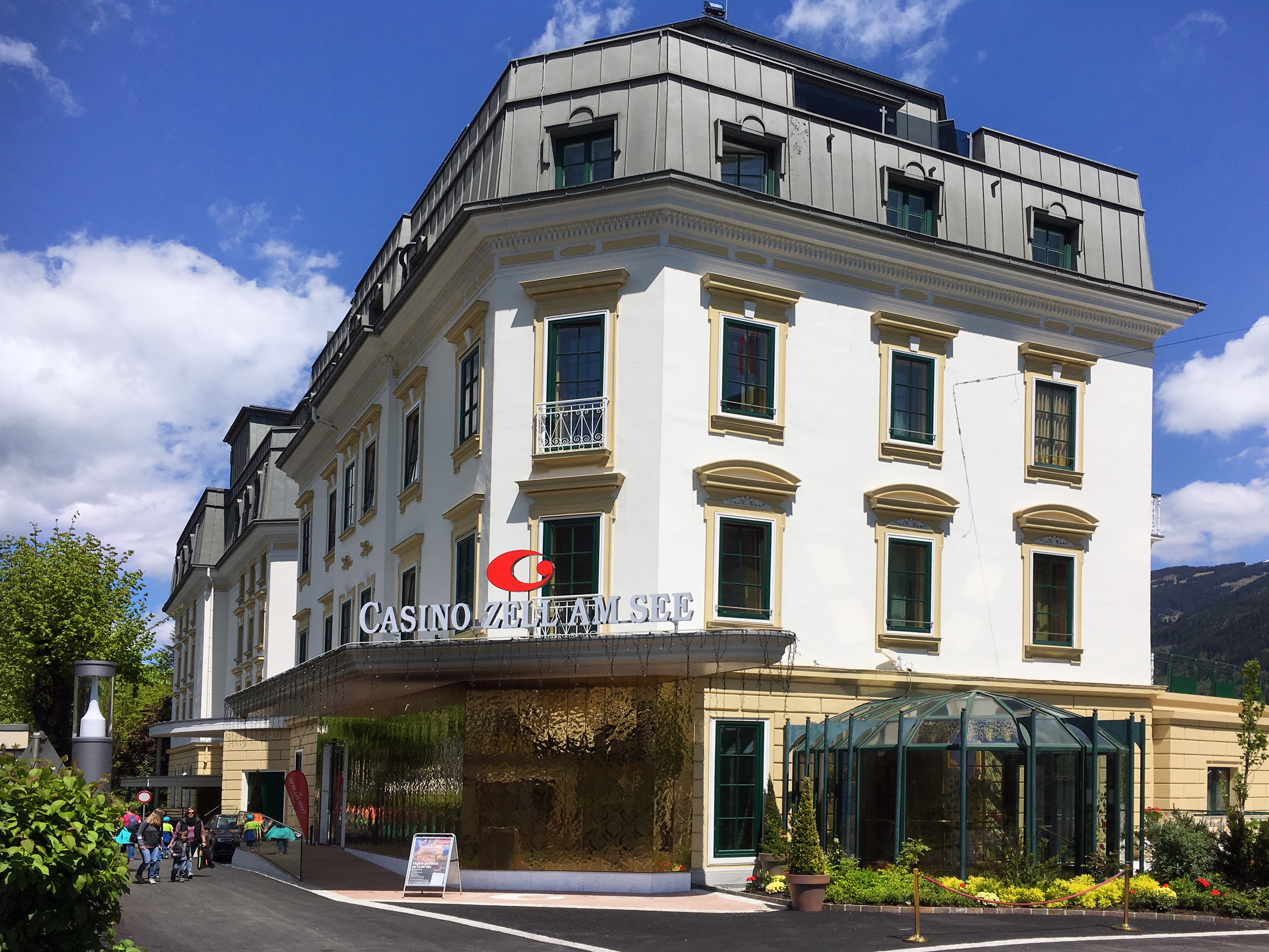
Casino Zell am See
