= Renaissance castle in Galanta =

Castle in Galanta, Slovakia

Coordinates: 48°11′44″N 17°43′57″E

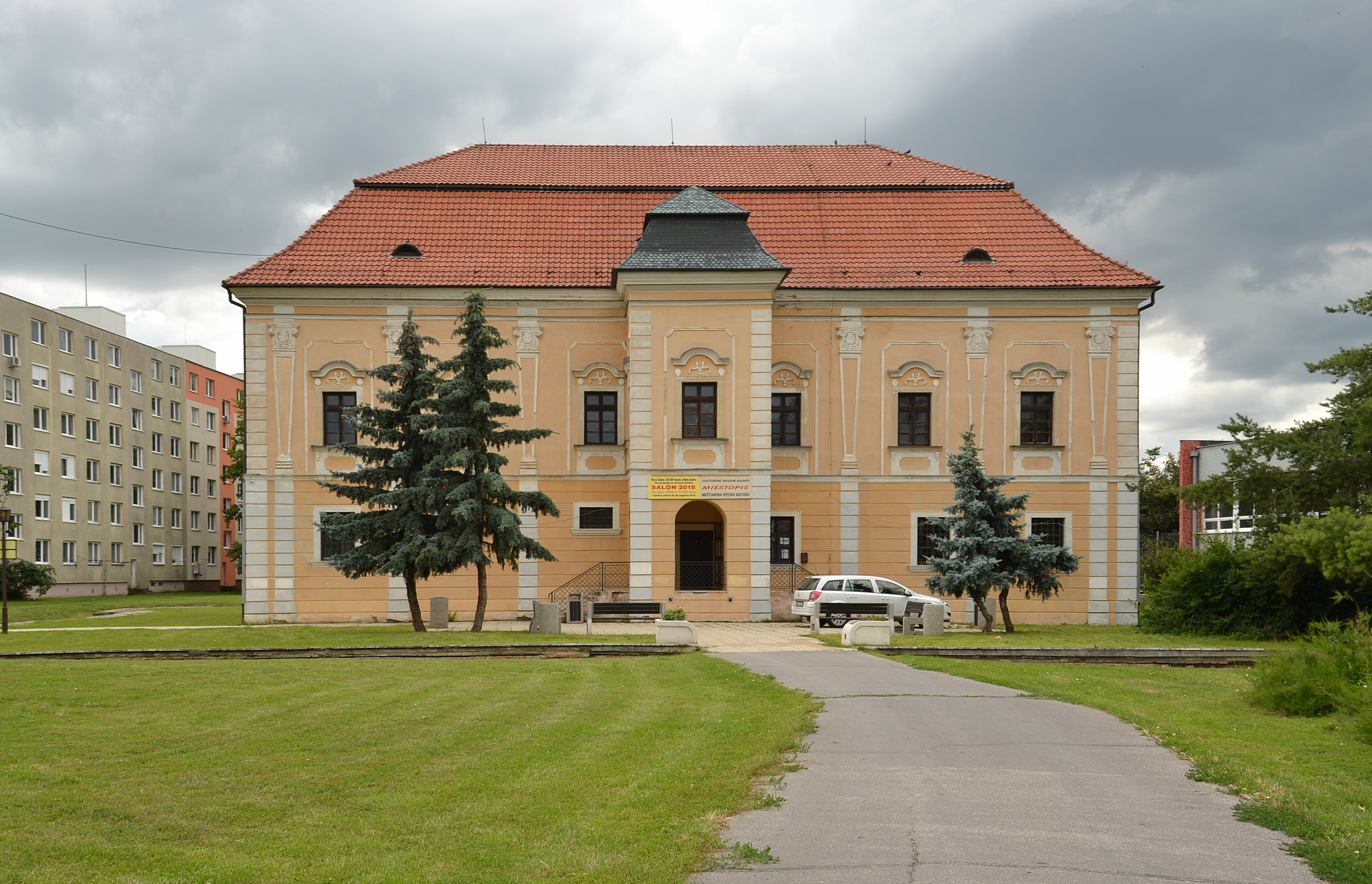
Main frontage of the building

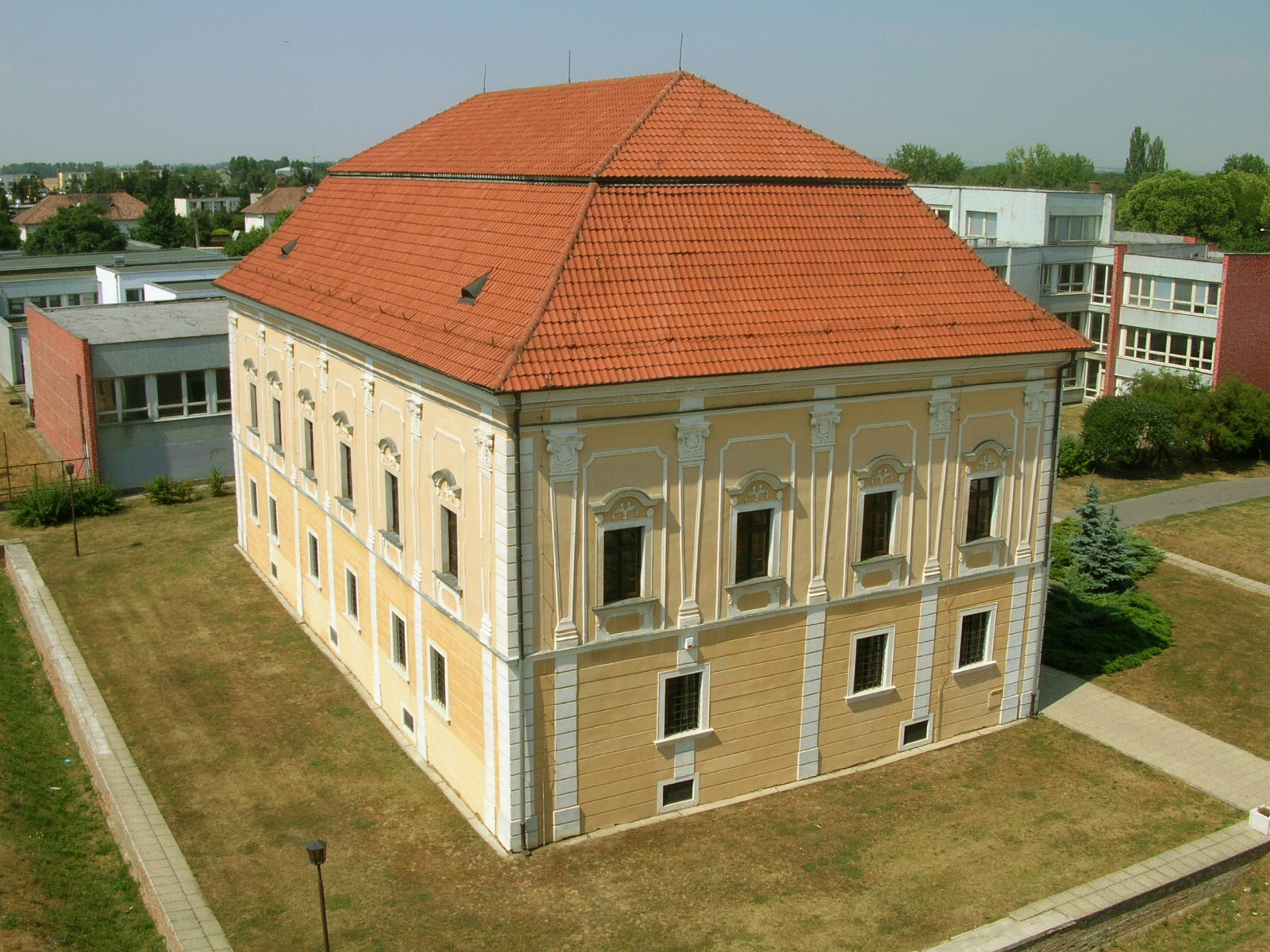
View of the side and back

The Renaissance castle in Galanta is a Renaissance-era castle that is one of the most important historic buildings in Galanta, Slovakia. Originally the residence of the Esterházy family (a branch called Esterházy "of Galanta"), it was built and inhabited by that family since around 1630, when it was built. It is still under renovation nowadays, and hopefully it will one day serve as a part of the regional museum in Slovakia. Its ground floor is a restaurant and serves as a place for holding wedding ceremonies and for bigger representational activities; the basement is a hip bar, and hosts cultural and social activities; and the first floor will in the near future serve as a gallery and for museum purposes.

== History ==
The castle was built by the Esterházy of Galanta family on previous basements. Its architecture is from Tudor England's Romantic Gothic Era, and it was set in a park. It belonged since then to the Esterházy of Galanta family, which was from around 1600 onward one of the most powerful aristocratic families in all of Europe until around 1930. Its original two-wing disposition is with small changes still present. Attached to the main entrance of the castle was a small tower, which was slightly higher than the main part, and it was decorated with a Renaissance-style attic, which covered its low roof. The building had richly and colorfully decorated façades with large symmetric windows. All Renaissance castles were also called manors.

== See also ==
- Schloss Esterhazy (Galanta)
