= Karol Duchoň =

Slovak singer (1950–1985)

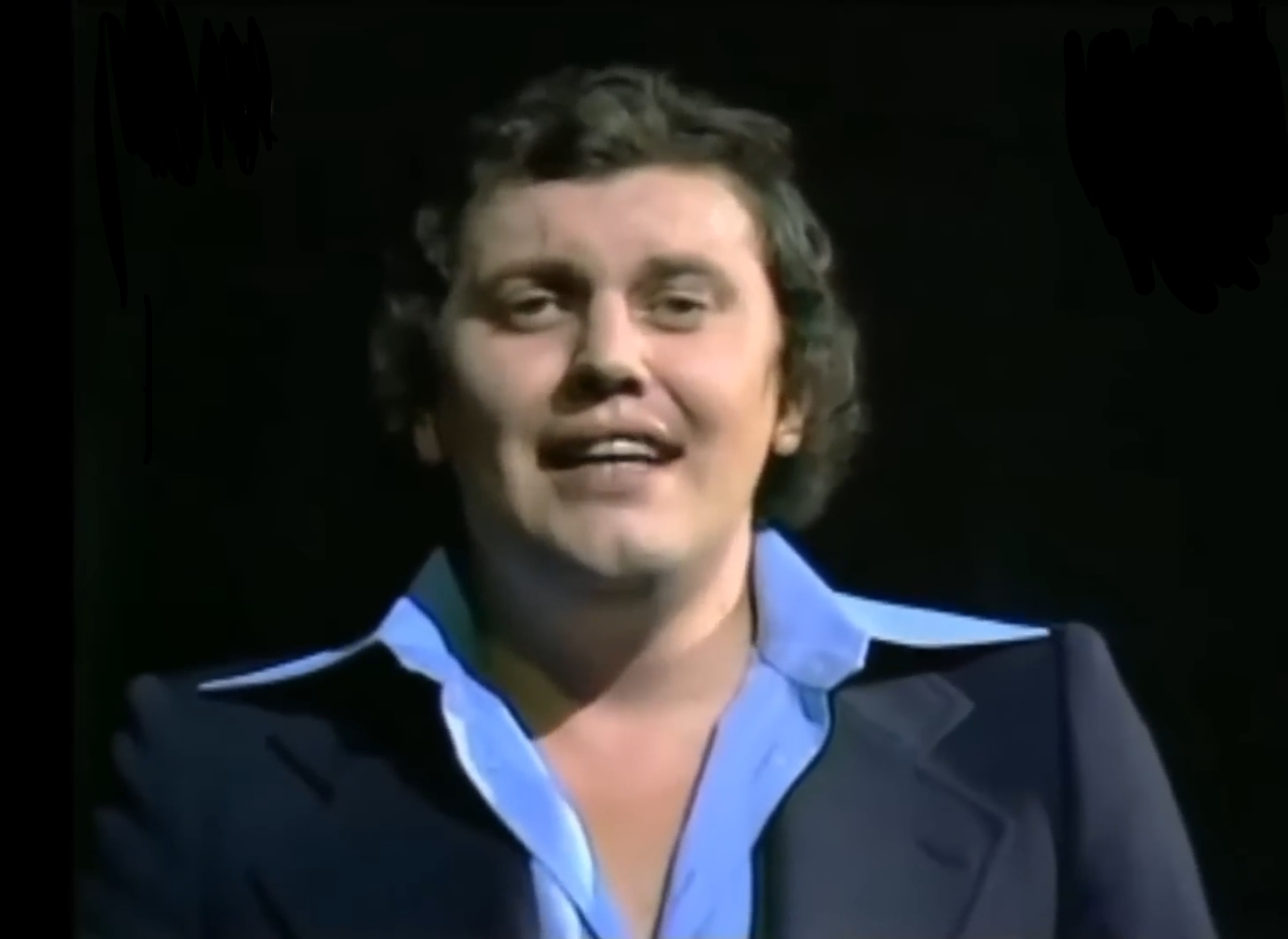
- Duchoň in 1976

Background information
- Born: 21 April 1950; Galanta, Czechoslovakia
- Died: November 5, 1985 (aged 35) Bratislava, Czechoslovakia
- Genres: Pop
- Years active: 1968–1985
- Award: Bratislavská lýra

Karol Duchoň (21 April 1950 – 5 November 1985) was a Slovak singer known for his role in Slovak music during the 1970s and early 1980s. He is widely regarded as one of the most influential male performers in Slovakia, being nicknamed "the Slovak Tom Jones" for his distinctive voice and international appeal.

Born on April 21, 1950, in Galanta, Czechoslovakia, Duchoň began his musical career in 1968, when he and Robert Kazík founded the band "The Ice Boys" in Zlaté Moravce. He scored a hit in the television hit parade with the cover song "Sugar, Sugar", which became known to listeners as Uber pary. He collaborated with the Braňa Hronca Orchestra, later with the Juraj Velčovský Orchestra. During this period, he sang duets with Marcela Laiferová and Dušan Grúň. In the first half of the 1970s, Duchoň collaborated with Eva Kostolányiová, with whom he won silver at the Bratislavská lýra '73 for the song "Chvála humoru". He won the Golden Bratislava Lyra for the song "Zem pamätá". He performed regularly in Germany, the Soviet Union, Poland, Hungary, Bulgaria, even Cuba, France and Japan. Duchoň died on 5 November 1985, in Bratislava at the age of 35.

== Early life ==
Duchoň was born on 21 April 1950 in Galanta, Czechoslovakia (now Slovakia). He attended elementary school in his hometown. Growing up, he was the only son of his father, who served as director of a local mechanical engineering training institute, and his mother, Oľga, who came from Báčsky Petrovec. After finishing elementary school, Duchoň enrolled in the mechanical engineering industrial school (strojnícka priemyslovka) in Partizánske, but he did not complete his studies there. While his parents were on holiday in Yugoslavia, he went to perform abroad with the Jaroslav Mikula orchestra.

== Career ==
=== 1968–1973: Beginnings and breakthrough ===
Duchoň's professional singing career began in 1968 when he co-founded the group The Ice Boys (Ľadoví chlapci) in Zlaté Moravce with Robo Kazík. He later made his television debut singing "Uber pary", a Slovak cover of "Sugar Sugar", in the program Malá televízna hitparáda. In 1969, Duchoň started singing with Eva Máziková as part of Braňo Hronec's orchestra. He subsequently collaborated with the orchestras of Braňo Hronec and Juraj Velčovský. In June 1970, he competed for the first time at the Bratislavská lýra with the song Kto má ťa rád. During this period, Duchoň recorded duets with Marcela Laiferová and Dušan Grúň, notably the song "Vonia kakao" with Grúň. Duchoň achieved a significant breakthrough in 1973 by winning the silver Bratislavská lýra award, shared with Eva Kostolányiová for their duet "Chvála humoru".

=== 1974–1980: Peak years and international success ===
In 1974 Duchoň won gold at the Bratislavská lýra festival for the song "Zem pamätá". That same year he founded his own backing group, Prognóza, and released his self-titled debut album on the Opus label. The following year, 1975, Duchoň represented Czechoslovakia at the Yamaha World Popular Song Festival in Tokyo, where he performed "Čardáš dvoch sŕdc". In 1976 he recorded and released the German-language album Portrait Einer Stimme on RCA, which led German critics to nickname him the "Slovak Tom Jones". He followed this in 1977 with the Opus album Čardáš dvoch sŕdc and a performance at the MIDEM festival in Cannes. During this period, Duchoň performed regularly in Germany, the Soviet Union, Poland, Hungary, Bulgaria, even Cuba, France and Japan.

=== 1981–1985: Later career ===
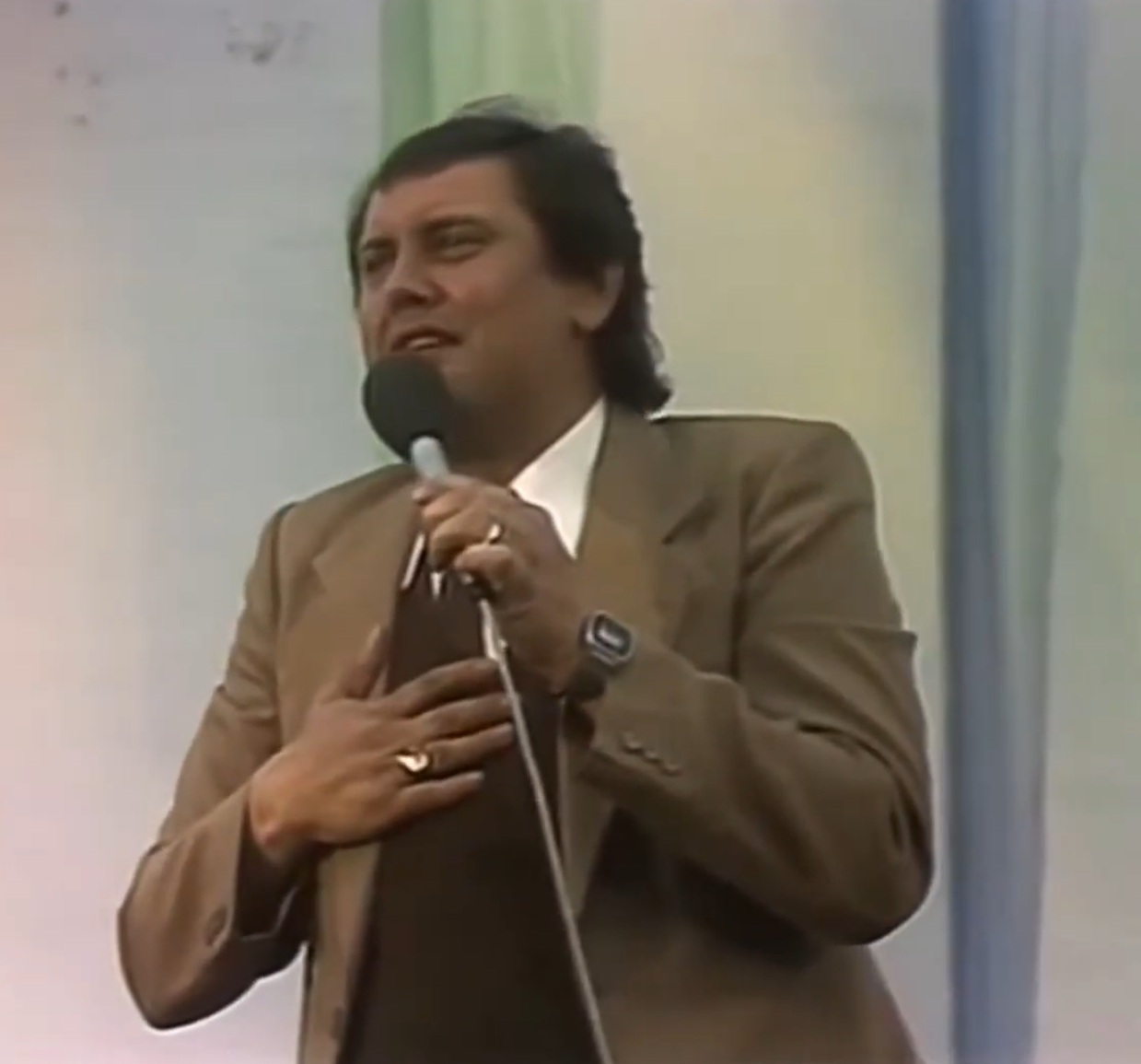
Duchoň performing the song "Smútok krásnych dievča" in 1982

In the early 1980s, Duchoň maintained his music career through long-term cooperation with Vlado Valovič’s VV-Systém orchestra, which served as his primary accompanying ensemble for performances and recordings. From 1982 onward, he also collaborated with Pavel Zajáček’s group Za-ja-ce. His final original studio album, Karol Duchoň, was released by Opus in 1980, standing as his last major collection of new material.

== Death ==
Duchoň died on 5 November 1985 at the age of 35 in Bratislava, Czechoslovakia. The cause of his death was alcoholic cirrhosis of the liver, which developed as a result of long-term excessive alcohol consumption. This condition was significantly worsened by severe jaundice he had suffered in childhood, which had already weakened his liver function. In the advanced stages of cirrhosis, he developed complications such as ascites (a swollen abdomen), jaundice, and eventually kidney failure as a direct result of the damaged liver. His lifestyle, marked by excessive alcohol consumption, contributed to the rapid progression of the disease and his premature death.

== Personal life ==
Duchoň was married twice. His first marriage took place in 1972 to Elena Šuráková, with whom he had a daughter named Danka, his only child. The marriage ended in divorce in 1985. Shortly after the divorce was finalized, Duchoň married Alena Čermáková in February 1985. Čermáková worked as a sound engineer at the Slovak Radio. No children were born from this marriage, which lasted only until Duchoň's death in November 1985.

== Legacy ==
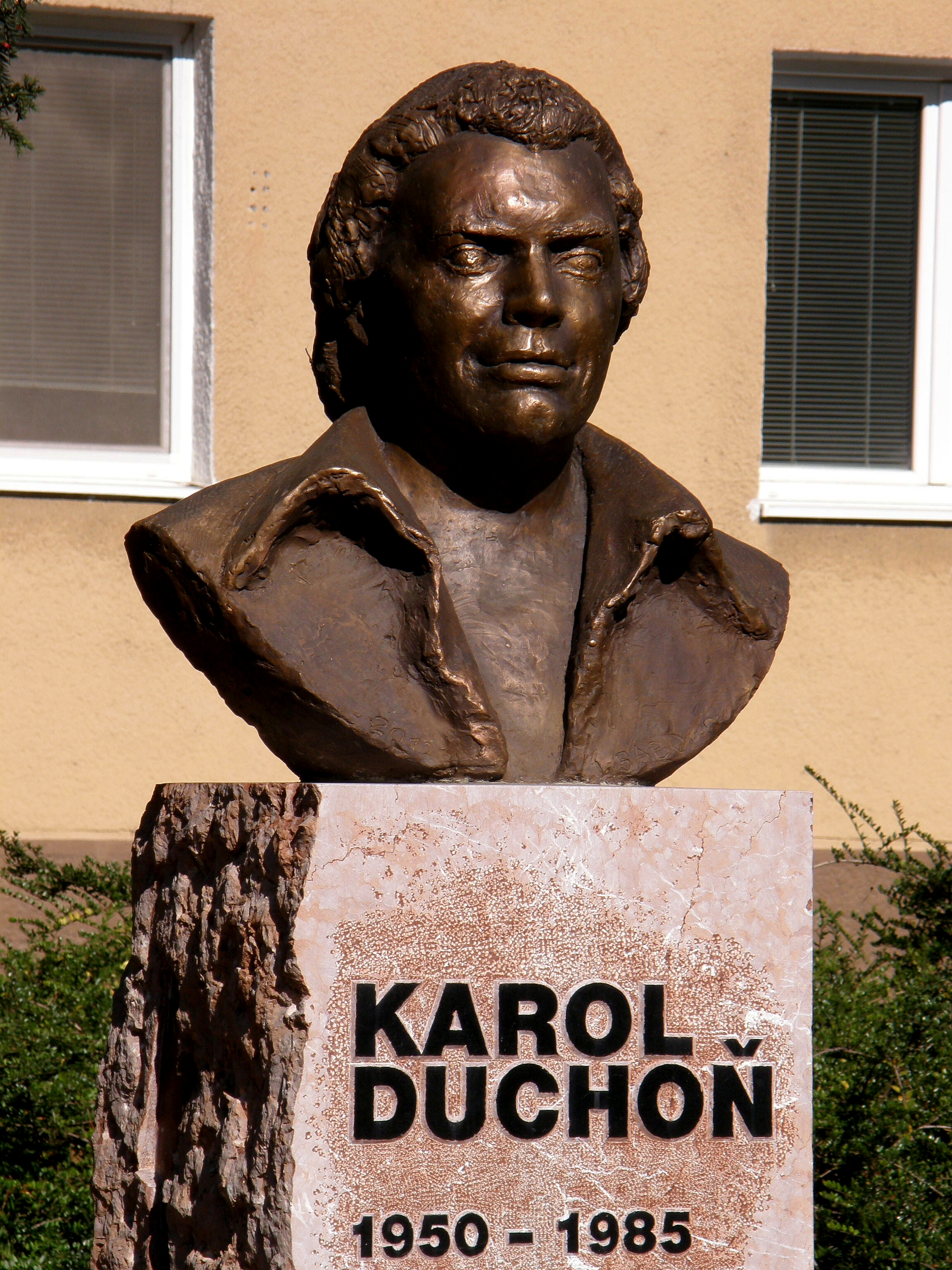
Memorial sculpture of Duchoň in Galanta

Duchoň received several posthumous honors reflecting his lasting impact on Slovak popular music. In 2006, the Academy of Popular Music awarded him the Aurel prize in memoriam for his lifelong contribution to the musical culture of the Slovak Republic. A memorial bronze bust was unveiled in Galanta on April 21, 2012, mounted on a stone pillar in front of the residential building where Duchoň lived until age 13. Sculptor Ladislav Sabo created the bust, with architect Ladislav Struhár responsible for the overall design, and the project received funding from the Trnava Self-Governing Region, the City of Galanta, and Matica slovenská Bratislava. Since the late 1990s, the annual Kantiléna event in Galanta has commemorated his legacy through a singing competition and concert featuring interpretations of his songs, drawing participants and audiences in regular editions exceeding 20 installments. A biographical film titled Duchoň, directed by Peter Bebjak and starring Vladislav Plevčík in the title role, premiered in 2025.

In the 2019 RTVS poll Najväčší Slovák, which ranked the greatest figures in Slovak history based on public votes, Duchoň placed 78th.

== Discography ==
Albums

- 1974: Karol Duchoň - LP - Opus
- 1976: Portrait Einer Stimme - RCA, (nemecky) LP
- 1977: Čardáš dvoch sŕdc (LP), Opus
- 1980: Karol Duchoň – Opus
- 2008: Muzika –

Singles

- 1970: „Nálady (Sugar Sugar)“ – Karol Duchoň / „Dante a ty“ – Dušan Grúň – Supraphon 0 43 0991
- 1970: „Slová“ – Marcela Laiferová / „Kto má ťa rád“ – Karol Duchoň (Bratislavská lýra 1970), Opus 0 43 1001 h
- 1970: „Biela pani“ – Karol Duchoň / „Mám v dlani zrnká vetra“ – Eva Máziková – Supraphon 0 43 1074
- 1971: „Na srdci hraj“ – Karol Duchoň / „Nebezpečná hra“ – Eva Máziková, Opus 90 43 0061 h
- 1971: „Jediná“ / „Pod modrým nebom“, Opus 90 43 0089
- 1971: „Vonia Kakao (Co–co)“ – Orchester Juraja Velčovského / „Cesta za šťastím“ – Dušan Grúň, Opus 90 43 0096 Pieseň Vonia kakao naspieval spolu s Dušanom Grúňom s Orchestrom Juraja Velčovského, v ktorom vystupovali ako speváci
- 1971: „Ľadová rozlúčka (I Can See)“ – Karol Duchoň / „Zazvoní“ – Oľga Szabová, Opus 90 43 0100
- 1971: „Pieseň o decembri“ – Karol Duchoň“ / „Vráť mi spánok“ – Tatjana Hubinská, Opus 90 43 0102
- 1972: „Rapid do toho“ – Karol Duchoň / „Butterfly“ – Dušan Grúň, Opus 90 43 0113 g
- 1972: „Biely klaun“ – Helena Blehárová / „Keď flauta začne hrať“ – Karol Duchoň, Opus 90 43 0118
- 1972: „Dievča menom Ján (Samson and Delilah)“ – Sexteto Ľuba Beláka / „Kto mi podá dlaň“ – Karol Duchoň, Opus 90 43 0168
- 1972: „Záhrada piesní“, Opus
- 1972: „Sen o mieri“, Opus
- 1973: „Kamenný kvietok“ – (SP) + Marcela Laiferová, Opus
- 1973: „Láska je v nás“ / „Uspávanka“, Opus
- 1973: „Jazvečík Boby“ / „Zvony pre šťastie“, Opus 90 43 0254 h
- 1973: „Chvála humoru“ – Karol Duchoň a Eva Kostolányiová / „Keby náhodou“ – Karol Duchoň (Bratislavská lýra 73), Opus 90 43 0261 h
- 1973: „Je čierny“ – (SP) + Marcela Laiferová, Opus
- 1974: „Predavač žrebov“ / „Pieseň tuláka – Opus 80 43 0324 h
- 1974: „Básnik a učeň“, Opus
- 1974: „Príboj/Píšem ti na žlté listy“, Opus
- 1974: „Šiel, šiel...“ / „S bielou hmlou“, Opus 91 43 0363 h
- 1976: „Edeltraut“ / „Wenn die Sonnenblumen bluhen“, RCA (nemecky)
- 1976: „Lass Uns Eine Nacht Lang Tanzen“ / „O Maria“, RCA (nemecky)
- 1976: „Lass uns eine Nacht lang tanzen“ / „O Maria“, Opus (nemecky)
- 1976: „Edeltraut“ / „Wen die Sonnenblumen bluhen“, Opus (nemecky)
- 1976: „Mám ľudí rád“, Opus
- 1976: „Fontána“ / „Hraj, hraj“, Opus
- 1976: „Elena“ / „V slovenských dolinách“, Opus 91 43 0418 h
- 1976: „Ružové ráno“ / „Adios, láska zlá, Opus 91 43 0421 h
- 1976: „Gitara“ / „Láska je halúzka čerešňová“, Opus
- 1977: „Mám dobrú správu“ / „Ten druhý“, Opus
- 1978: „Cítim“ / „Zmeškaný vlak (SP)– Opus
- 1978: „Žiari more“ / „Pohľadnica“, Opus
- 1978: „Hrám“, Opus
- 1980: „Brat slnko, sestra zem“ / „Tak sa vráť“, Opus
- 1981: „Dych tvoj páli“ / „Primášovo srdce“, Opus
- 1984: „Neviem byť sám“ – Elán / „Volám ťa, láska“ – Karol Duchoň – Opus 9143 0619 h
- 1984: „Vzdialená“ / „Sen o veľkej láske“, Opus

Complete albums

- 1974: Bratislavská lýra '74 - Opus, LP, B2. Zem pamätá - Karol Duchoň, B6. Zrnko soli - Karol Duchoň a Jana Kocianová.
- 1976: Schlager - Single - RCA
- 1978: Dvanásť do tucta - Diskotéka Opusu 2 - Opus - MC, LP - B5. „Zvony pre šťastie“
- 1978: Nestarnúce melódie - Opus - LP (reedícia na CD - 2006) „Nečakaj ma už nikdy“, „Dve oči neverné“ - Karol Duchoň/„Rád polku mám“, „Stupavská krčma“, „V skalickom hájičku“ - Karol Duchoň a Miroslav Ličko a Dušan Grúň a Zdeno Sychra
- 1979: Dvanásť do tucta - Diskotéka OPUSU 3 - Opus 9113 0873, LP, A6- Čert by bol v tom, B1- Tak sa maj.
- 1996: Hviezdne Vianoce - Opus
- 2002: Hvězdy nad Bromem - FR centrum FR 0046-2 EAN 8594046 745299 - Orchester Gustava Broma - 16. „Hrám“
- 2005: Retrohity - Slovak Radio Records - 11. „V dolinách“
- 2006: SK hity 3 - H.O.M.E. Productions - 18. „V slovenských dolinách“
- 2006: Nestarnúce melódie - Opus (reedícia LP z 1978)
- 2007: Gejza Dusík – Najkrajšie piesne - Opus - 01. „Rodný môj kraj“
- 2007: Hit storočia - Opus - 02. „Rodný môj kraj“ - cd2
- 2007: !Boom! hity - H.O.M.E. - 13. „V slovenských dolinách“
- 2007: Největší slovenské hity 60. a 70. let - Popron Music - 07. „V slovenských dolinách“
- 2007: 20 Naj retro Vianoce - Opus - 04. „Pieseň o decembri“ / 08. „Zvony pre šťastie“
