= Holetín =

- Municipality
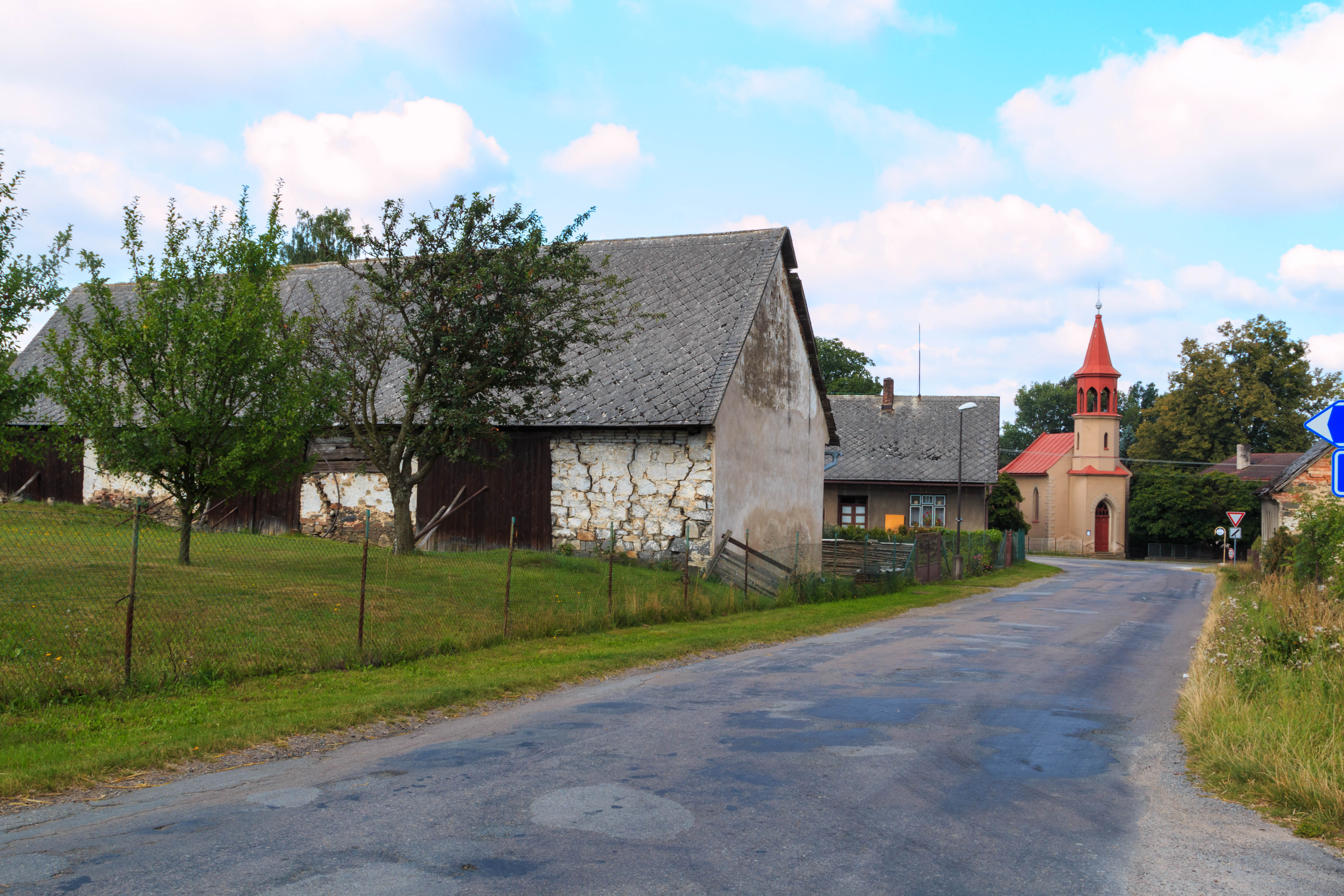
- Chapel of Saint John the Baptist

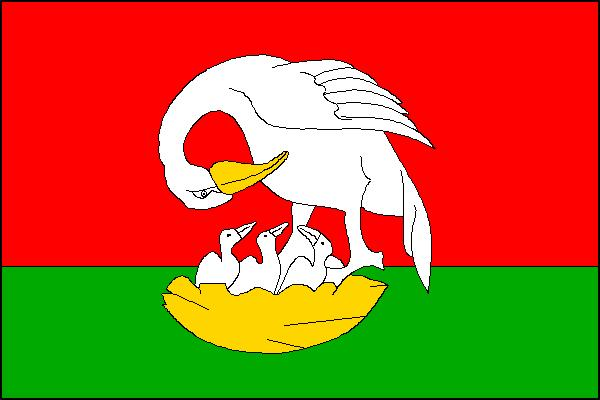
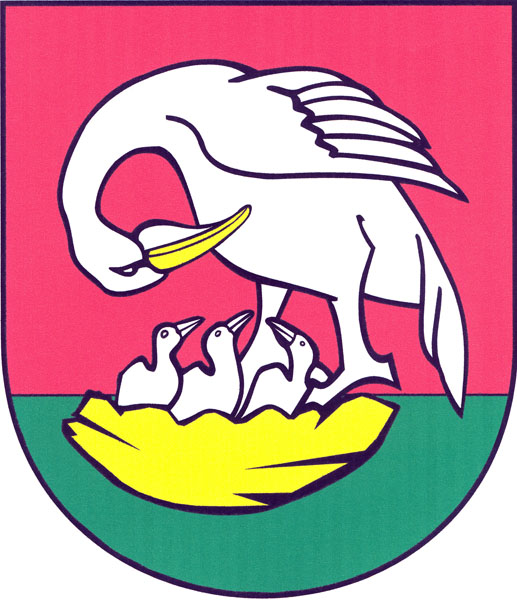
- Flag Coat of arms

- Location in the Czech Republic
- Coordinates: 49°48′8″N 15°55′37″E
- Country: Czech Republic
- Region: Pardubice
- District: Chrudim
- First mentioned: 1144

Area
  - Total: 10.67 km^{2} (4.12 sq mi)
- Elevation: 570 m (1,870 ft)

Population (2026-01-01)
  - Total: 805
  - Density: 75.4/km^{2} (195/sq mi)
- Time zone: UTC+1 (CET)
  - Summer (DST): UTC+2 (CEST)
- Postal codes: 539 01, 539 71
- Website: www.obecholetin.cz

Holetín is a municipality in Chrudim District in the Pardubice Region of the Czech Republic. It has about 800 inhabitants.

== Administrative division ==
Holetín consists of three municipal parts (in brackets population according to the 2021 census):

- Dolní Holetín (348)
- Horní Holetín (458)
- Horní Babákov (5)

== History ==
The first written mention of Holetín is from 1144. It was situated on a trade route from Bohemia to Moravia.

== Demographics ==
Historical population
Year	Pop.	±%
1869	1,453	—
1880	1,401	−3.6%
1890	1,441	+2.9%
1900	1,434	−0.5%
1910	1,554	+8.4%
1921	1,429	−8.0%
1930	1,437	+0.6%
1950	1,090	−24.1%
1961	1,017	−6.7%
1970	917	−9.8%
1980	808	−11.9%
1991	737	−8.8%
2001	759	+3.0%
2011	747	−1.6%
2021	811	+8.6%
Source: Censuses
