= Palais Esterházy (Kärntner Straße) =

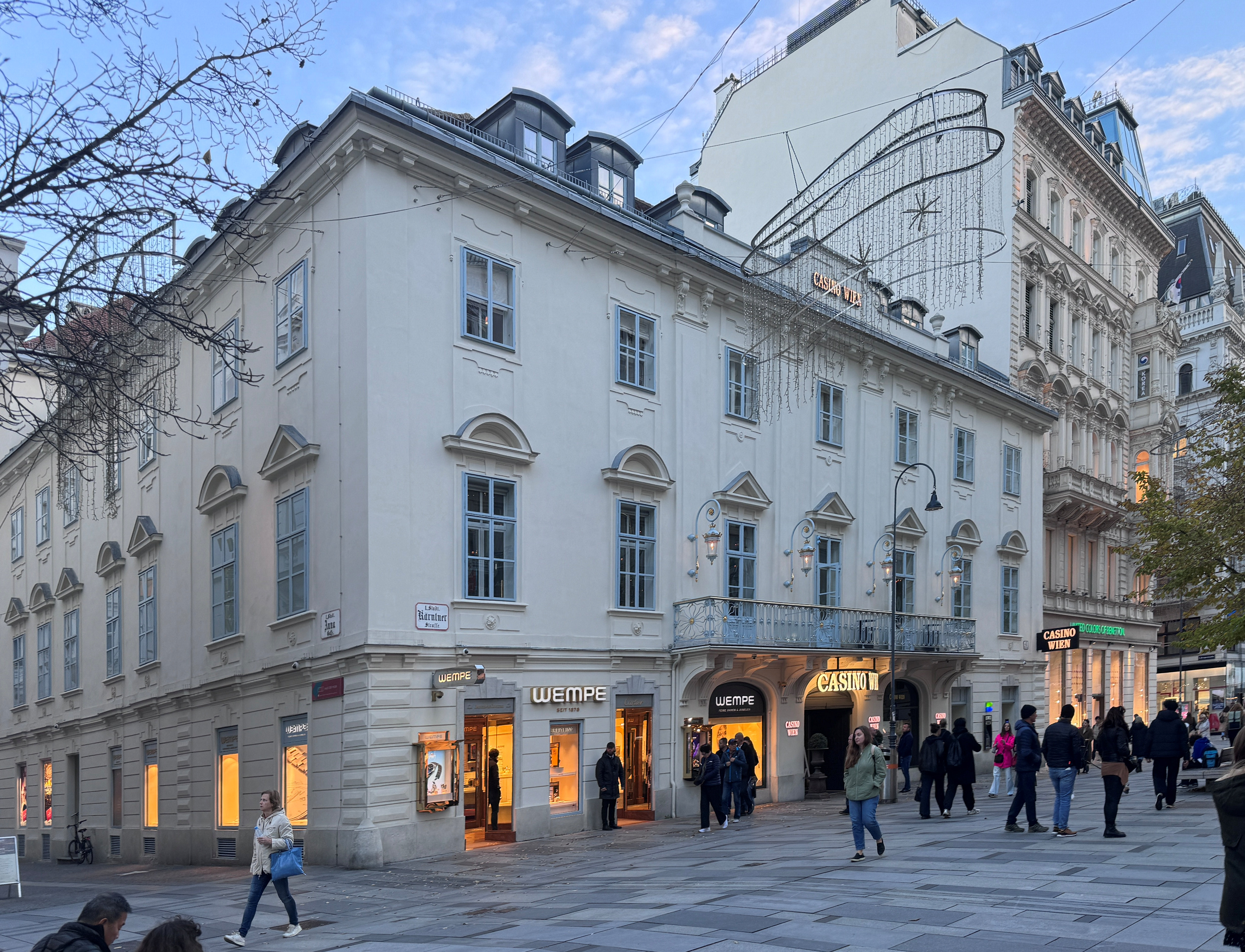
- Exterior of the building in 2024
- Interactive map of the Palais Esterházy area

General information
- Location: Kärntner Straße 41, Vienna, Austria
- Coordinates: 48°12′16.18″N 16°22′14.79″E

Palais Esterházy is a Baroque-style palace in Vienna, Austria, owned by the noble Esterházy family. It houses a Casinos Austria gaming establishment known as Casino Wien. There is also a Wempe boutique on the ground floor.

The palace is one of two with the same name in Vienna. This particular Palais Esterházy is on Kärntner Straße, whereas the other palace is on Wallnerstraße.

== History ==
Originally, two different houses stood on the current site of the palace, which were only united at the beginning of the 15th century. In 1684, this property came into the possession of the Imperial Councilor Adam Antonius Grundemann von Falkenberg. His son eventually commissioned the construction of the current palace. It remained in the possession of the Grundemann family until 1767, when they were elevated to the rank of Count in 1716. It was then acquired by the Court Chamberlain Baron Franz von Harrucker de Békés-Gyula.

From 1777 to 1871, the palace belonged to Count Károlyi and was known as the Károlyi Palace. At that time, under Countess Josefa Károlyi, the façade was redesigned to its current form and a balcony was added. Further minor alterations were made in 1833. Originally, the palace had an inner courtyard, which was later expanded to the upper floor.

In 1871, the palace finally became the property of the Esterházy family when Count Moritz Esterházy bought the property from Count Alois Károlyi. The count then had the interior of the palace redesigned. On the main front (Annagasse side) is the entrance portal with the Esterházy coat of arms cartouche.

On 25 January 1968, the interior of the palace was almost completely destroyed by fire. After repairs and reconstruction work, the Casino Cercle Wien was opened in 1969. This was expanded several times and can still be found in the palace today. Only a few fragments of the original Empire-style furnishings remain. The majority of the rooms are now decorated with contemporary works of art.

== See also ==
- Palais Esterházy
