= Esterházy Palace (Bratislava) =

Palace in Bratislava, Slovakia

- Esterházyho palác
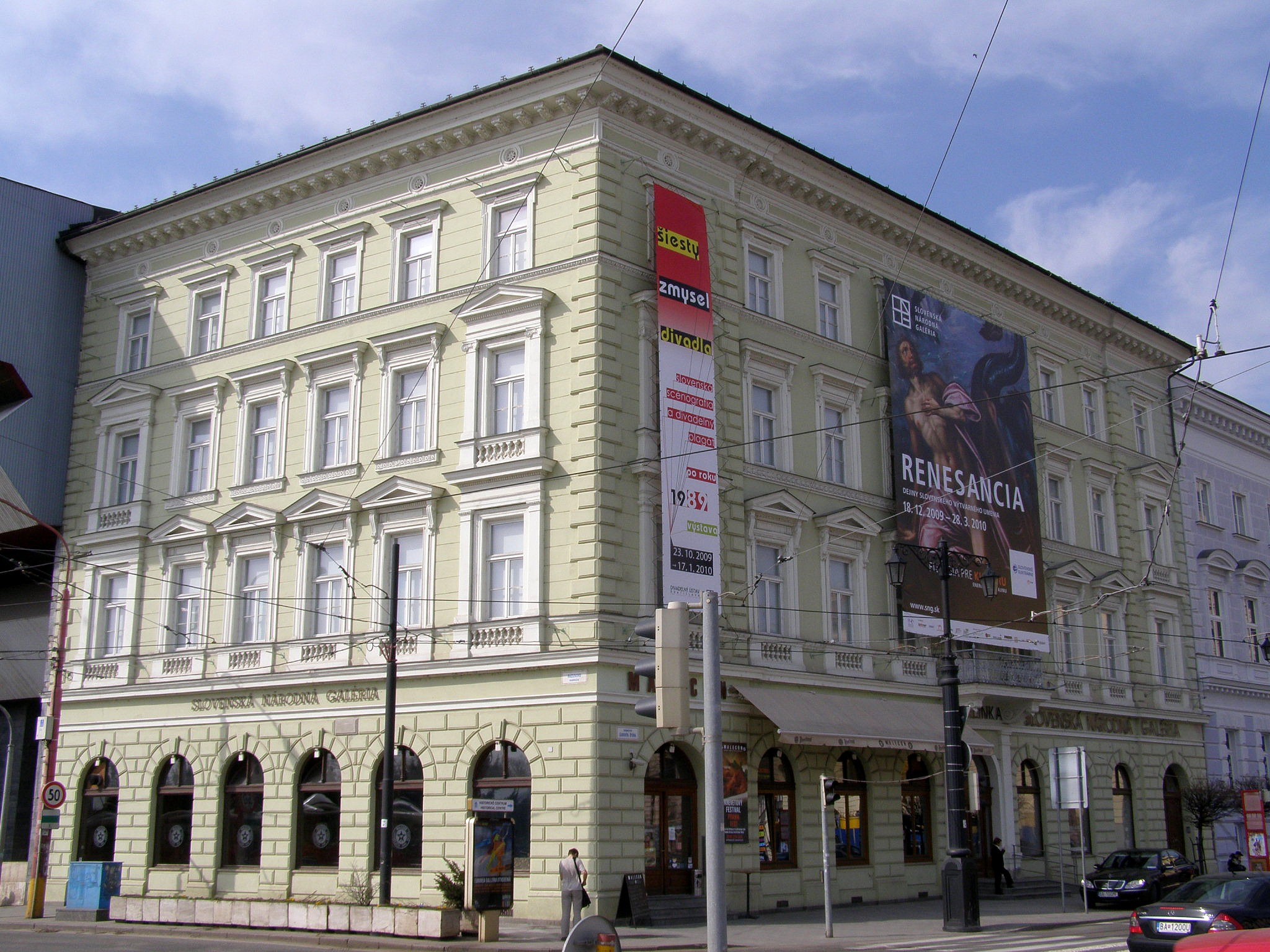

General information
- Type: Palace
- Location: Old Town, Bratislava, Slovakia
- Coordinates: 48.1402°N 17.1094°E

Esterházy Palace (Slovak: Esterházyho palác) is a Neo-Renaissance style building in the Old Town of Bratislava, Slovakia, near the Danube riverfront, built in the 1870s. The building was reconstructed in the 1920s and in the 1950s, when it was adapted for the Slovak National Gallery.

Today, with the adjacent Water Barracks and modern extensions, it hosts the Slovak National Gallery exhibitions.
