= Palais Esterházy =

Coordinates: 48°12′35″N 16°22′01″E

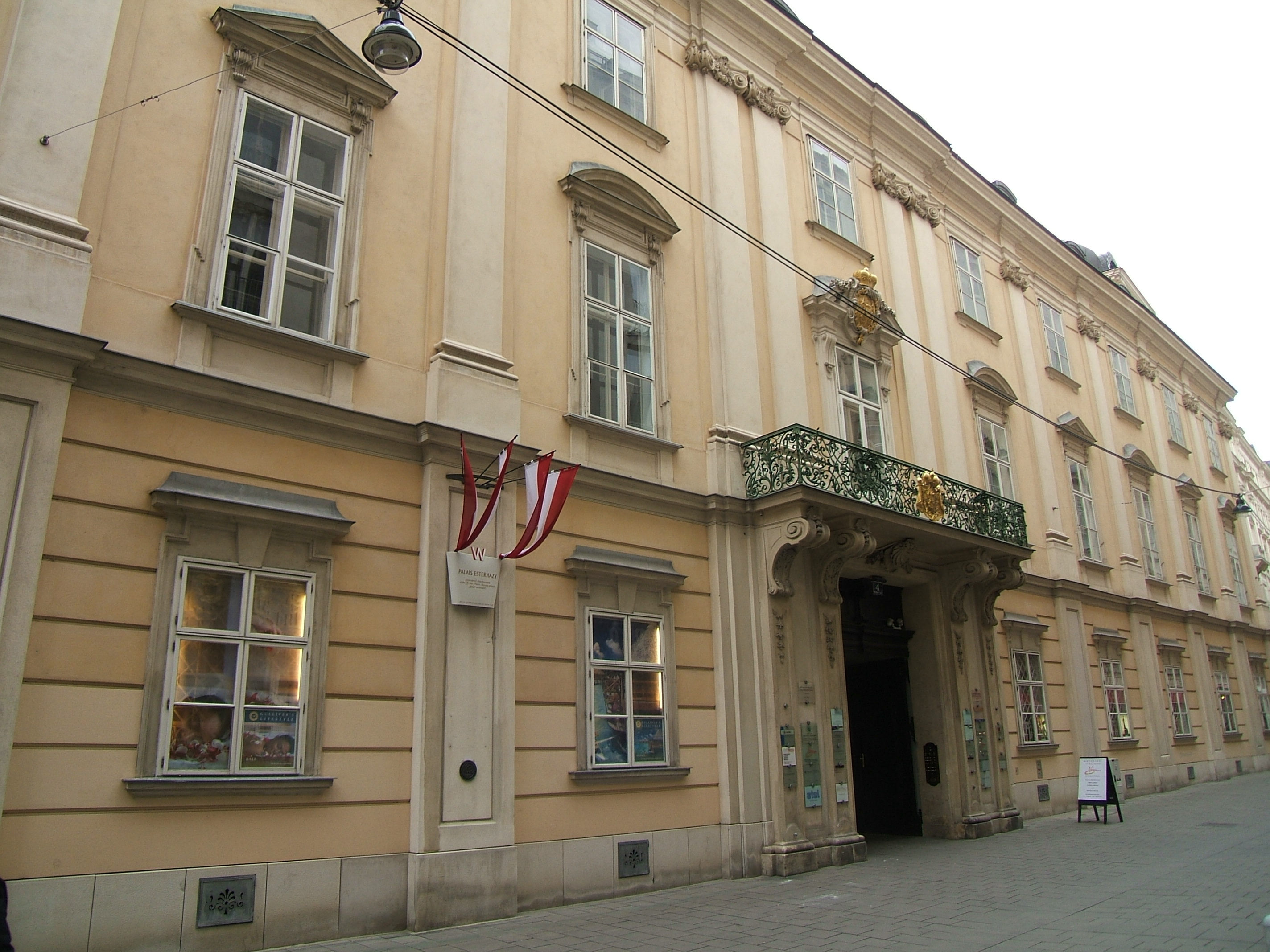
- Interactive map of the Palais Esterházy area

General information
- Location: Wallnerstraße 4, Vienna, Austria

Palais Esterházy is a Baroque-style palace in Vienna, Austria, owned by the noble Esterházy family. It houses a well-known restaurant called the Esterházykeller in the former wine cellars. It is also the location of the Viennese branch of the Museum of Illusions franchise.

The palace is one of two with the same name in Vienna. This particular Palais Esterházy is on Wallnerstraße, whereas the other palace is on Kärntner Straße. At one time, there were fourteen different properties on this site.

The first prince began building between 1685 and 1695. It was between 1806 and 1820 that the palace got the appearance we know today. During the 20th century, the family hardly used the palace. After renovations in the post World War II period, most parts were leased out.

== See also ==
- Palais Harrach
- List of restaurants in Vienna
