= Schloss Esterhazy (Galanta) =

Coordinates: 48°11′31.7″N 17°44′10.4″E

Schloss Esterhazy (also known as Chateau Esterhazy or Chateau Galanta), is a Neo-Gothic chateau in Galanta, southwestern Slovak built in 1633 by the Hungarian noble family Esterhaz. Nowadays the dilapidated chateau is being reconstructed by volunteers from the town sponsored by the deputy of mayor.

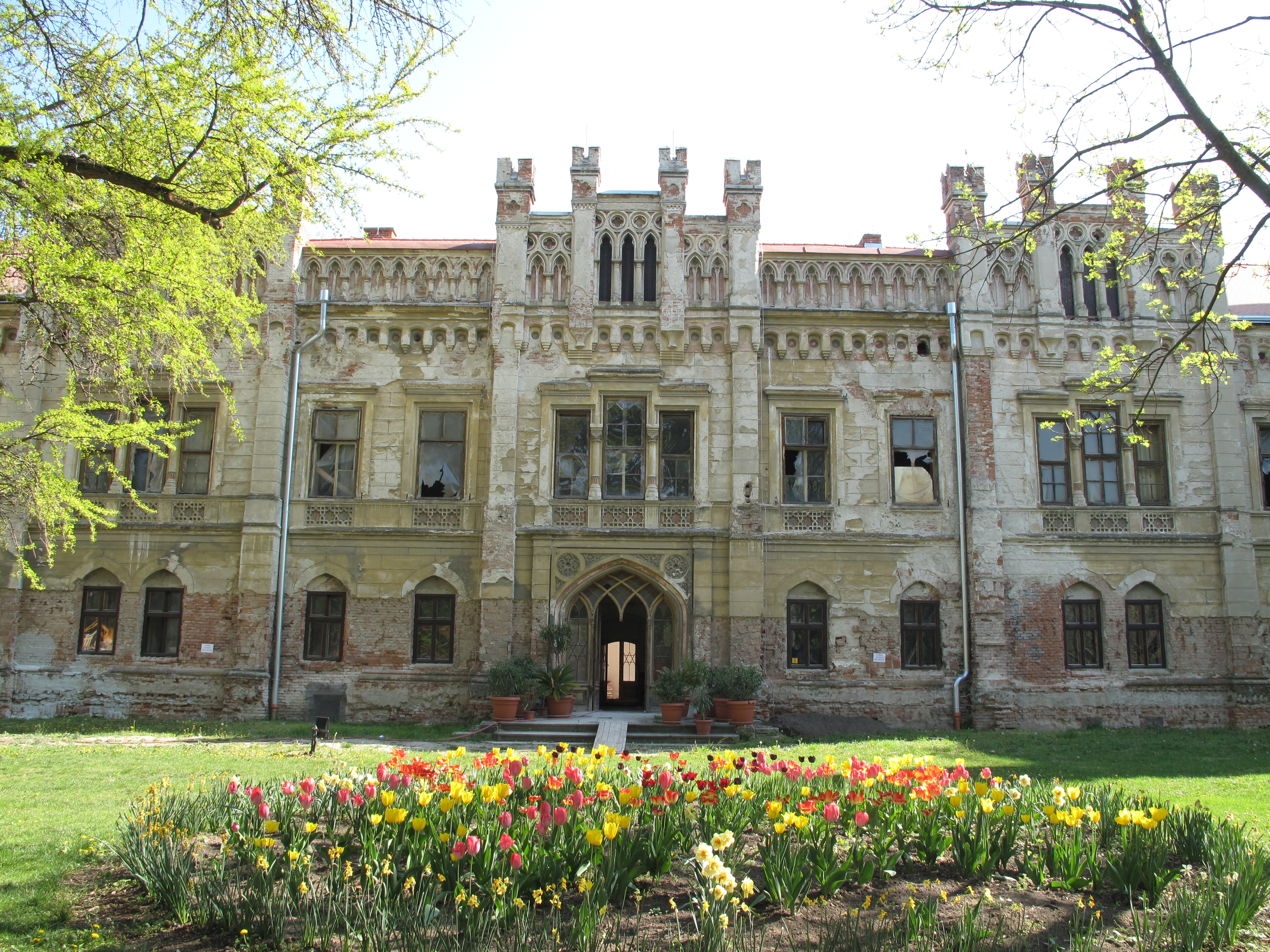
Neogothic chateu Galanta main wing

== History ==
The family "Esterhazy" had a major role in the history of the town. They built several buildings. The most important one was the chateau, originally designed as a Renaissance fortress-like residence, from the year 1633.

The building was designed by the brothers Daniel and Pavol Esterhazy. Construction started in 1633, during the first large economic expansion of the family.

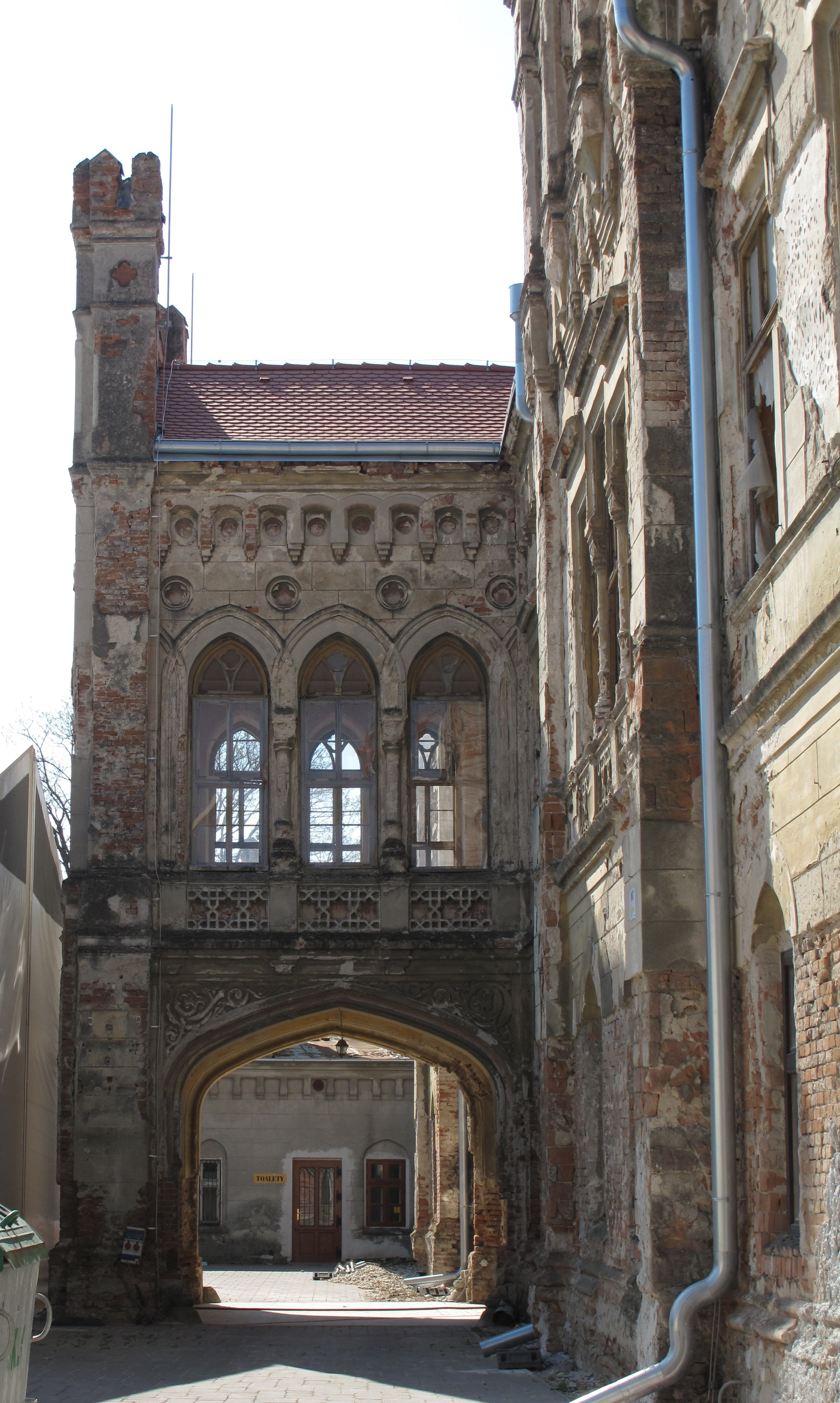
The main wing, the east entrance

Another member of the family Imrich, a bishop from Nitra, had it reconstructed in Baroque style in 1736. Only marble fireplaces have been preserved from this reconstruction It was given its present neo-Gothic appearance inspired by English Gothic in 1861.The latest and most radical modernisation was in 1861 based on romantic English Gothic style

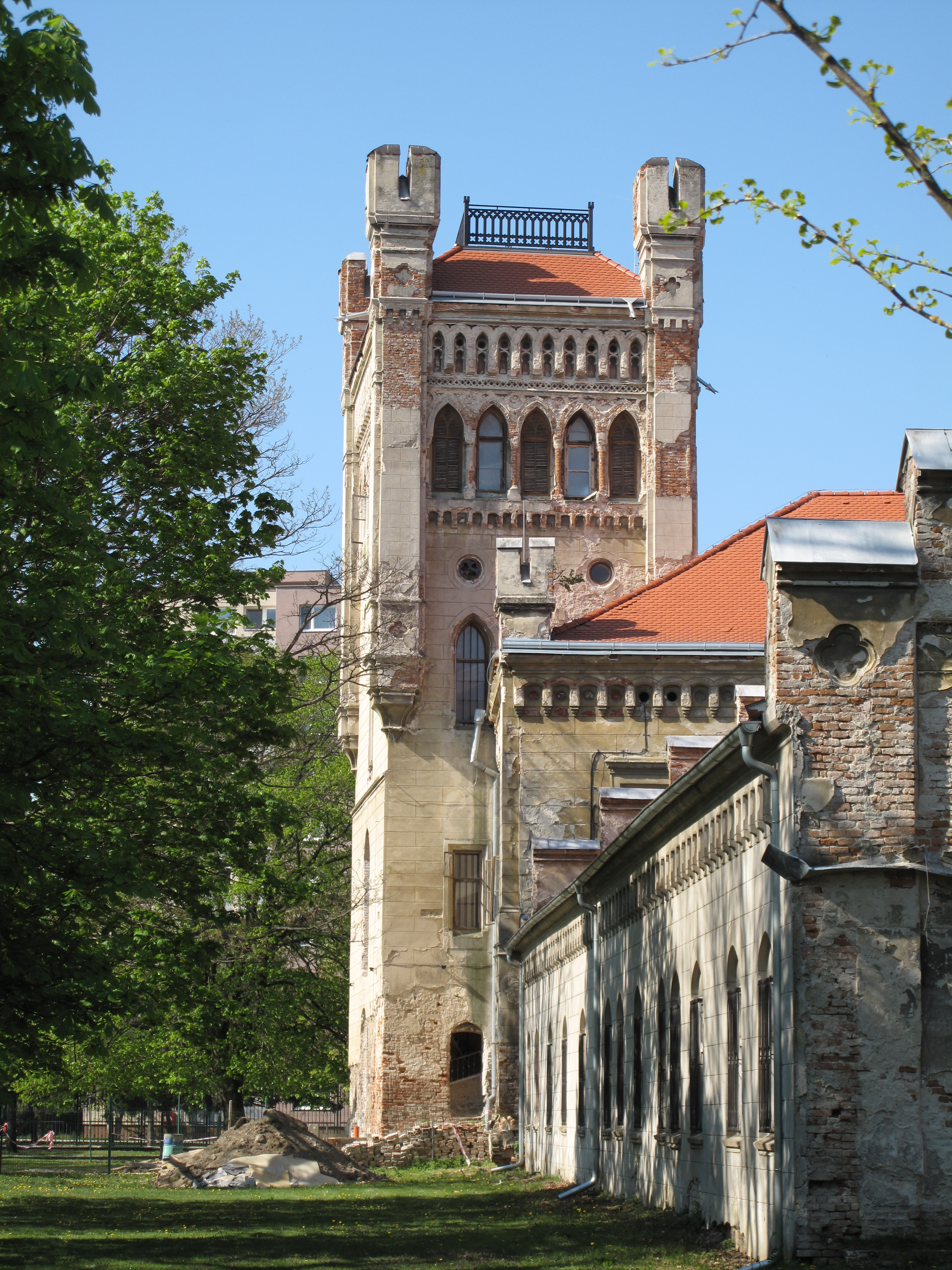
The tower, east side

== Appearance ==
The chateau is a monumental building with a U-shaped ground plan. The side wings create a closed courtyard. The two storeyed entrance wing used to be residential. There is a ceremonial staircase leading into the main rooms on the first floor. The side wings used to be farm houses.

=== Exterior ===
The original U-shaped ground plan has been partially preserved until today. The right wing has been separated from the main one and completely reconstructed.

==== The side wings ====
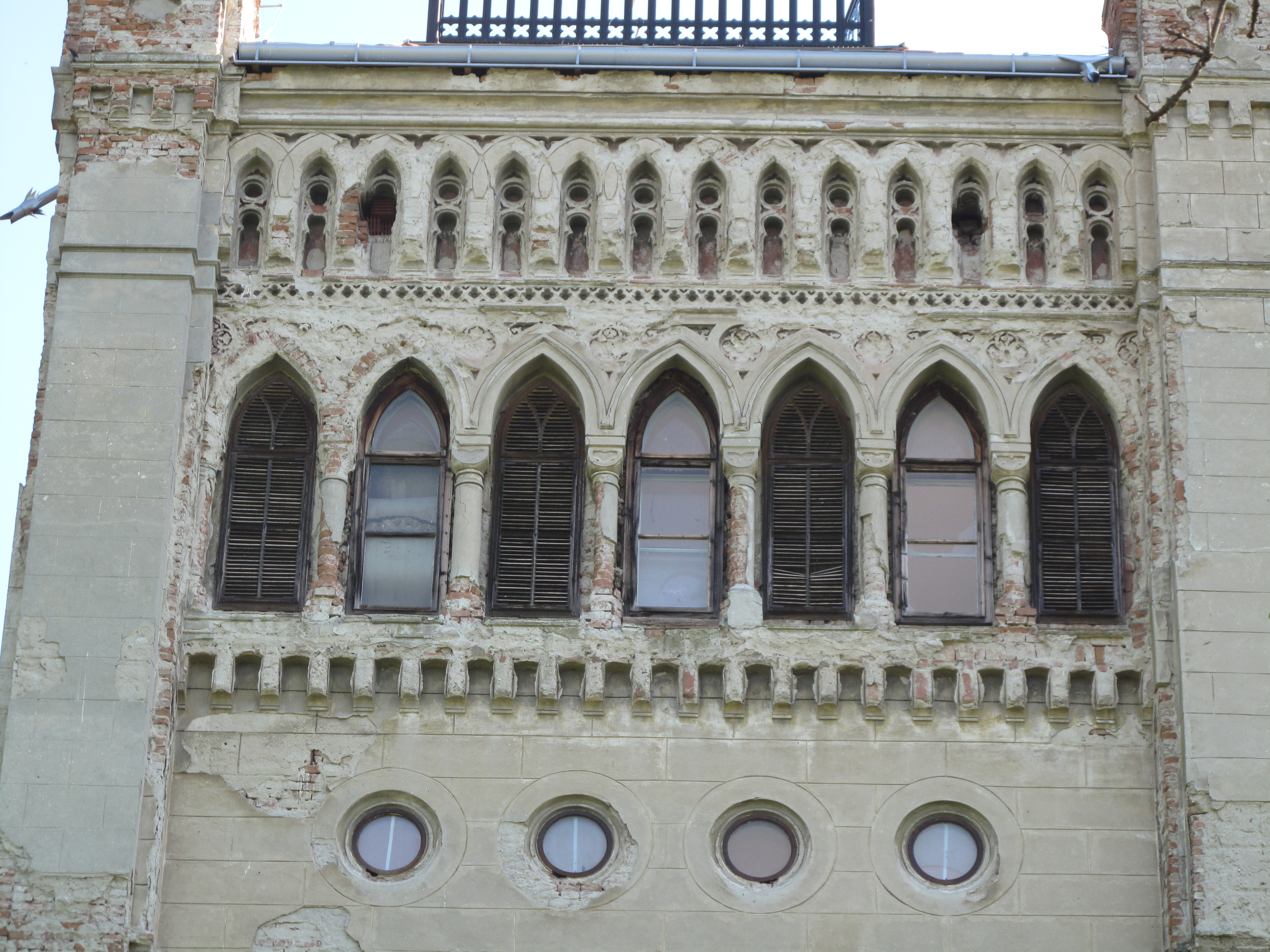
The tower, detail of the third floor

Both of the side wings have escalated frontage, each level is decorated with profiled quatrafoil and a little roof over it. The shape of the frontage copies the shape of a saddle roof, whilst it is taller and makes the wings appear more monumental than they actually are. It may appear that the side wings were not jointed to the main wing in the first place since the profilation of the frontage is repeated on the other side of the side wings facing the main wing just a couple of meters far from it. Since the side wings were originally used as stable there are only three small front windows in a row, centrally placed on the wall. All the windows are exactly alike; with a pointed arch on the top and no extra decoration.

==== The main wing ====
The main wing is now being reconstructed since it was in almost fatal condition. The wing is a two storied residence with one dominating feature – a four storied tower on the west side. The whole wing escalates from the bottom to the top. The plinth is simple stone work, just as the first floor. The windows have rectangular shape, but apparently used to have a pointed arc on the top. The cornice dividing the first and the second floor is also rustic and minor. While on the second floor, the windows are decorated with a simple edicule without any tympanon. The windows are united by another plain cornice. The chateau does not have a whole entablature, only the cornice and an arc-shaped frieze with added blind circle windows.

The main entrance used to be from the west side of the main wing. It appears like a one part triumphal arch connected to the wing.

==== The tower ====
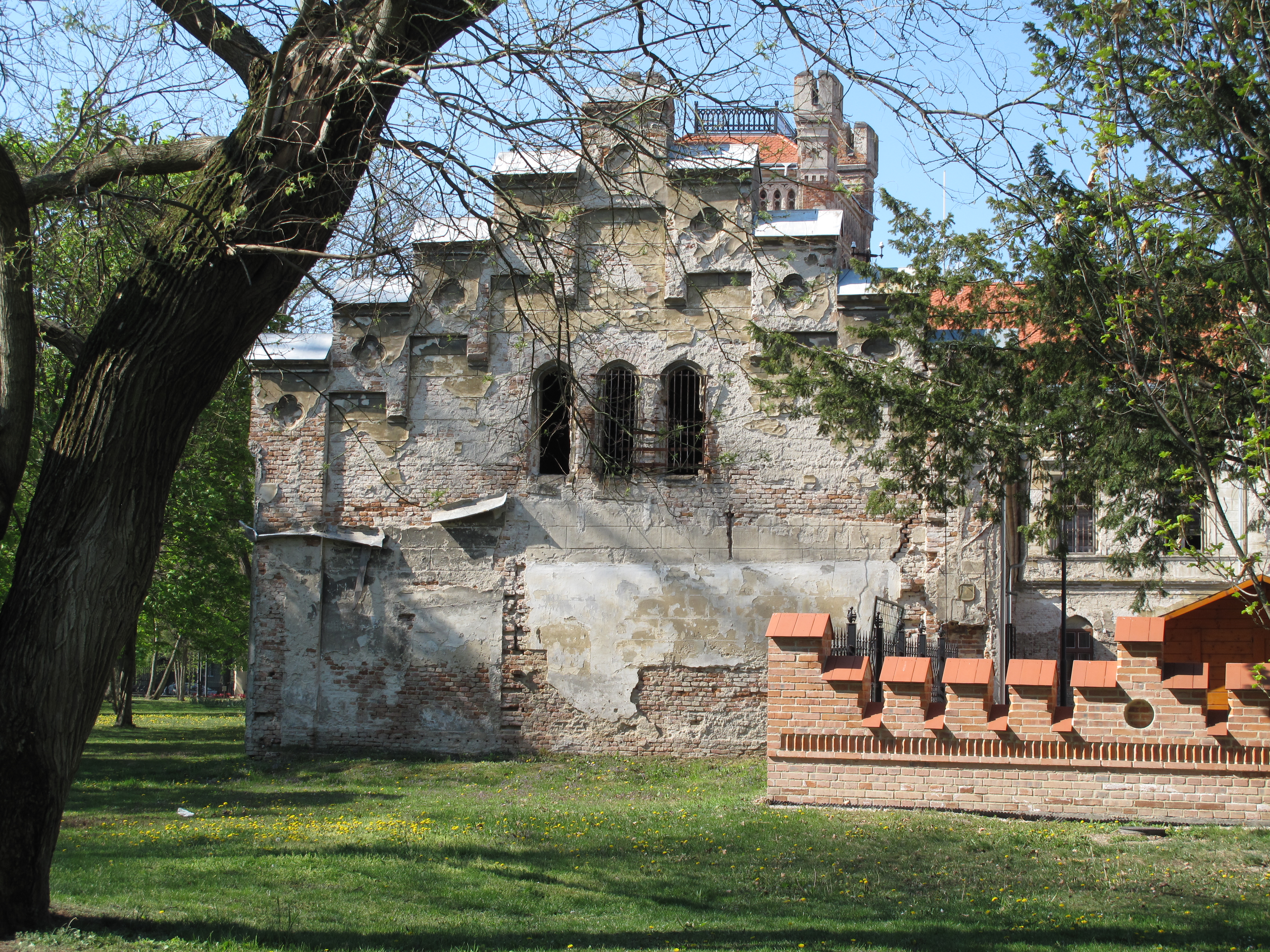
The side wing, original frontage

The tower is accented by four axially symmetrical bow windows reminding four smaller towers on the top. The placement of windows on the tower is obscure. They have the same shape (narrow with a pointed arc on the top) but they differ in size and a number in each storey. The most decorated ones are on the second floor, pointing to the importance of the floor. These windows slightlyresemble a triumphal arc. There are three equally long windows with two columns dividing them. In the bottom there is a low blind attic supported by two round corbels.

A peculiar feature of the tower are small round windows above the third floor, they probably represent a reference to the decor of the frieze. The tracery in the windows is very simple (round) and made of stone. The same is repeated on the west side in the middle part of the main wing.

=== Interior ===
Many historical rooms have not been entirely preserved, only some of the details, especially the vaults. The rooms differ in types of vaulting. Usually, they are rib vaults supported by funnel-like corbe s. An eye-catching element is the handrail of the main staircase. It is crafted in Gothic style and probably used to be gold plated.

== The chateau nowadays (2019) ==
The building is in a bad condition caused by poor care of the town council during communism and after the Velvet revolution. In 2012 the reconstruction began, due to interest of one of the Galanta's deputy and volunteers, which are organised by the Voluntary association Neogotický kaštieľ v Galante (Neo-Gothic chateau in Galanta).

== See also ==
- Renaissance castle in Galanta
- Zoznam kultúrnych pamiatok v Galante (list of cultural monuments in Galanta)
