= Budapest's Palace District =

Area of Budapest, Hungary

Coordinates: 47.492°N 19.066°E

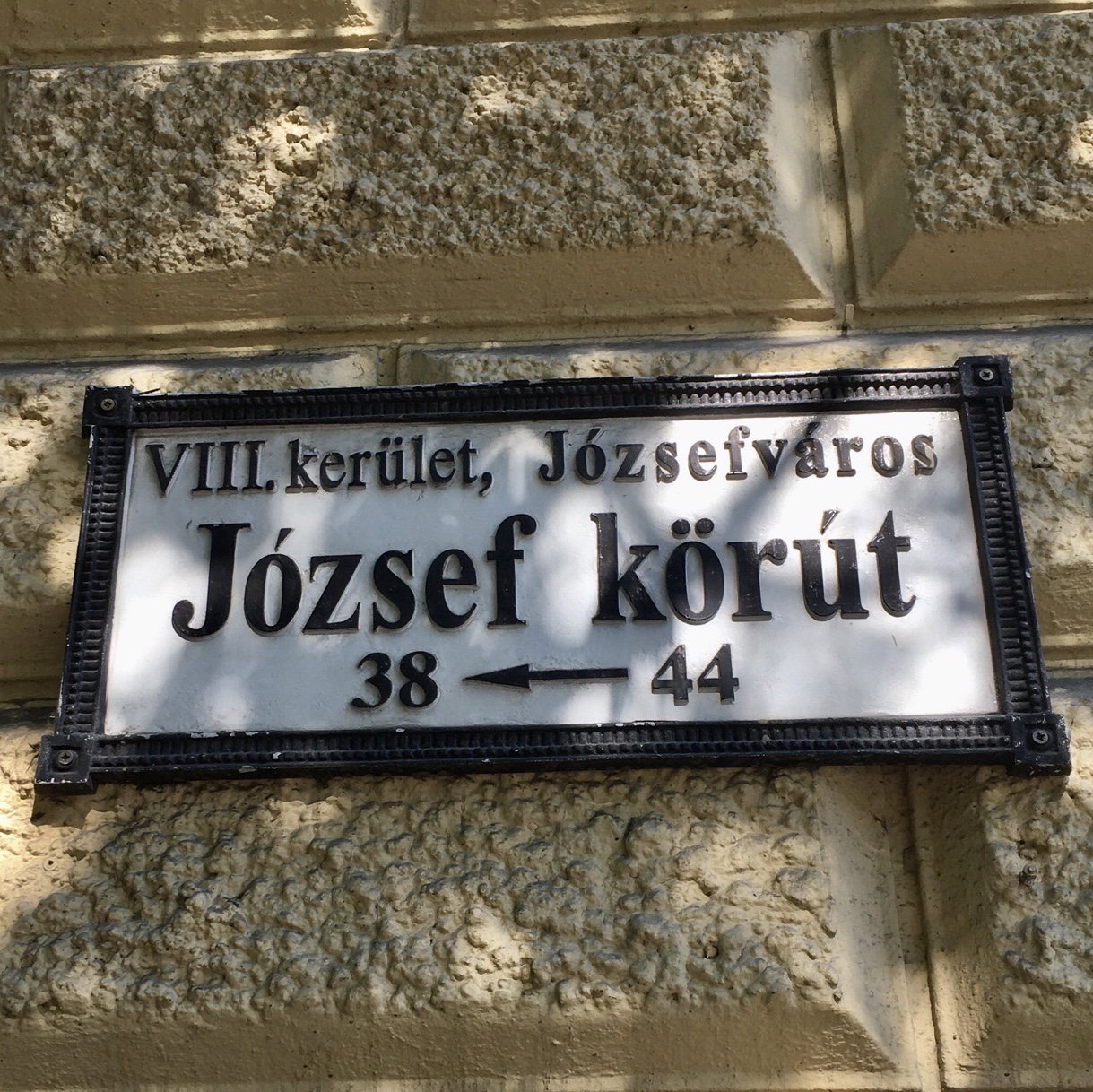
Józsefváros street sign

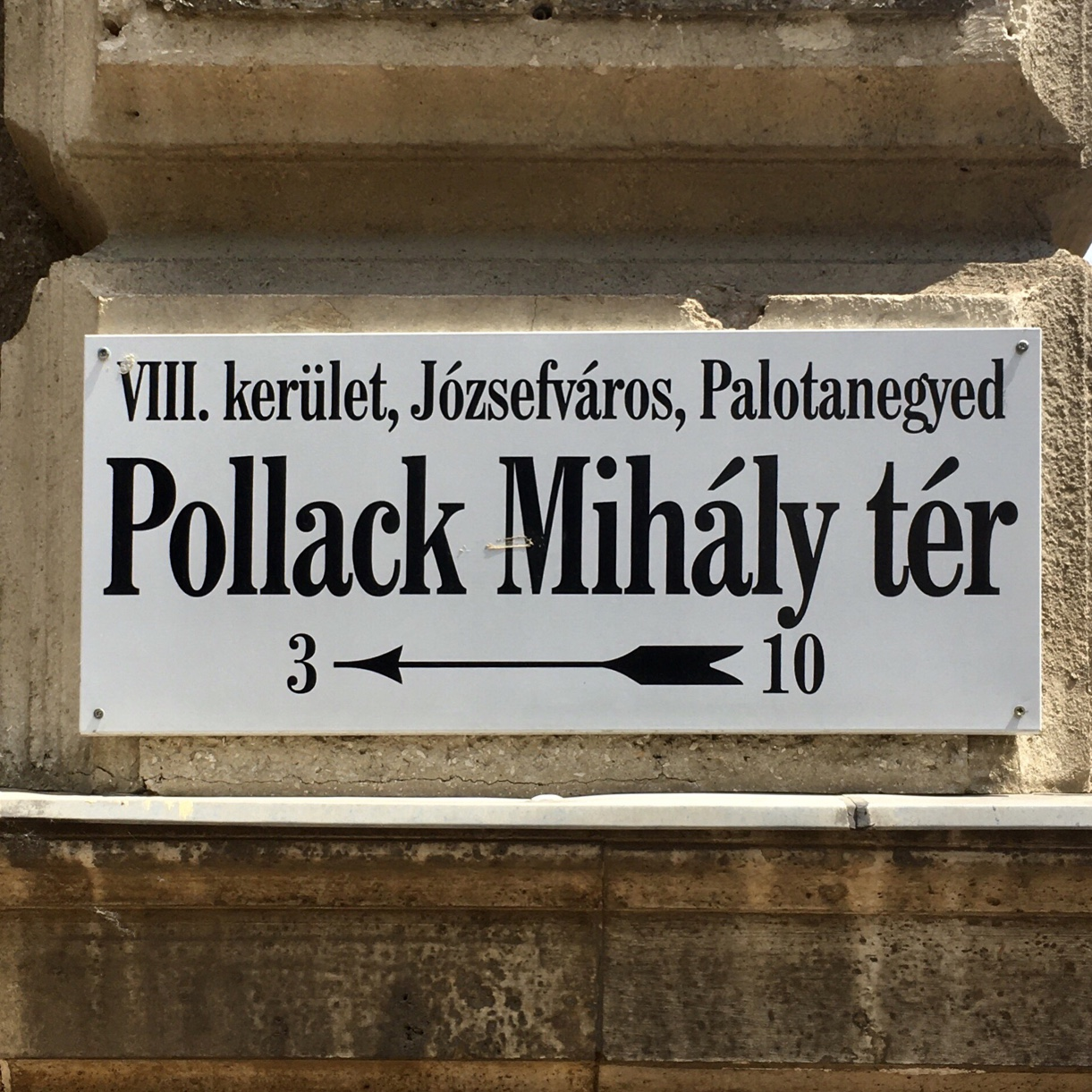
Palace District street sign

Budapest's Palotanegyed (Palace Quarter or Palace Neighbourhood) forms an inner part of Pest, the eastern half of Budapest. Known until the communist period as the ‘Magnates’ Quarter’, it consists of the most westerly part (west of the Nagykörút) of the city's Eighth District, or Józsefváros (Joseph Town), which was named on 7 November 1777 after Joseph II, Holy Roman Emperor and Archduke of Austria (1741-1790), who reigned 1765-1790 (1780-1790 as King of Hungary). (Vienna's Eighth District, the Josefstadt, was also named after him, but long after his reign, in 1850). Józsefváros developed immediately east of the medieval walls of Pest and was originally called Lerchenfeld ('Lark Field') or the Alsó-Külváros (‘Lower Suburb’). The Palotanegyed's borders are the Múzeum körút to the west, Rákóczi út to the north, the József körút to the east and Üllői út to the south. There is an extensive photo archive of the Palace District at the Fortepan website.

== Pre-1945 history ==
The two-metre great flood of 1838 caused the collapse of 900 buildings in the Józsefváros, with only 250 surviving. The few buildings in the Palotanegyed which survive from before 1838 include the Szent Rókus-kápolna (Chapel of St Roch – the patron saint of plague sufferers), built in 1711 in the hope of warding off the plague then devastating Pest, on the site of an early Christian, possibly 4th century, chapel. The oldest known building in the Palace District, it was rebuilt in 1945 after being destroyed in World War II – and then was damaged badly again in 1956. The Szent Rókus Kórház (St Roch Hospital) next door – was opened in 1796, but in its current incarnation offers few clues to its antiquity.

The major impetus for the area's development after the great flood was the construction at its western end of the magnificent neo-classical Hungarian National Museum between 1837 and 1847, designed by the Viennese-born architect Mihály Pollack, after whom the square behind the museum is named. Meetings of the upper house of the Hungarian parliament, established as part of the compromise which founded the dual monarchy of Austria-Hungary in 1867, were held in the National Museum until the opening of the new Hungarian parliament building in 1904.

The rest of Hungary's original parliament was established next door to the museum at Főherceg Sándor utca 8 (Archduke Alexander Street), named in honour of Hungary's Habsburg Palatine, or Viceroy, during the years 1790–95, Archduke Alexander Leopold of Austria, in 1840. (In 1946 it was renamed Bródy Sándor utca – see below). The building, completed in 1866, was designed by one of 19th century Budapest's great architects, Miklós Ybl, who also designed the Opera House and the Basilica, as well as five of the Palotanegyed's palaces (Festetics, Pálffy, Károlyi (on Pollack Mihály tér), Bókay and Odescalchi/Degenfeld-Schomburg). Today the old parliament building houses the Italian Cultural Institute.

Until the outbreak of the First World War, these two buildings provided the impetus for members of the dual monarchy's aristocratic and mercantile elite – many of whom were members of parliament – building around 40 city palaces or mansions in the same area. The Károlyi family alone built four palaces in the district, Count János Zichy and his family three, while the Bánffy and Wenckheim families each built two. The district's palaces were mostly constructed in the streets surrounding the Museum (today's Bródy Sándor utca, Pollack Mihály tér, Múzeum utca, Reviczky utca, Ötpacsirta utca and Trefort utca.) A number were also built further east, including on today's Lőrinc pap tér, Gyulai Pál utca, Horánszky utca and Szentkirályi utca. The other residential buildings constructed in the Palace District around the same time were designed mainly for middle or upper-middle class occupants. The term 'palota' ('palace') is used more elastically in Hungary (and in much of Continental Europe) than in the English-speaking world. In the Palotanegyed it refers to everything from genuine palaces (such as the Wenckheim Palace, now Szabó Ervin Library) for aristocratic families, to buildings with generously proportioned apartments for the wealthy upper-middle classes (such as the Emich Palace on Horánszky utca).

The Palace District is also notable for one of Budapest's two surviving buildings designed by the famous Viennese architects Fellner & Helmer, the István Károlyi or Károlyi-Csekonics palace at Múzeum utca 17. (The other is the Vígszínház on the Szent István körút).

One of the great classical architects of Pest, József Hild, designed one of the earlier buildings in the district, the 1842 Virágfüzéres ház (‘Garland House’) at Baross utca 40. After long being dilapidated, it was restored in 2021.

Most of the Palotanegyed's architecture echoes that of the Viennese Franz-Joseph era from the 1840s until World War One. However, there are also buildings in the Hungarian Secession style, championed most famously by Ödön Lechner, notably the striking Gutenberg Otthon, designed by two of his most prominent disciples, the Nagyvárád-born brothers József and László Vágó and constructed in 1905-6 (there are restoration/renovation plans for the building) There are several other buildings in the Hungarian Secession style on Vas utca, Baross utca and Krúdy utca. Lechner's Jewish student Béla Lajta's designed the 1912 Count Széchenyi School of Trade on Vas utca, a striking contrast to most of the Palace District's architecture, fusing modernism, art deco and folk motifs. Its rich interior decoration, remarkably, survived World War II.

A well-known Hungarian-Jewish architectural team also designed Hungary's first department store, the Corvin Áruház, on Blaha Lujza tér. The architect was Zoltán Reiss, who designed many buildings in Budapest and elsewhere in Hungary during the first decades of the twentieth century, and who also served as an officer in the Austro-Hungarian army in the First World War. Construction of the classicist building began in 1915, with the department store finally opening in 1926 (five years later it incorporated Hungary's first escalator). It was owned by M.J. Emden and Sons, Hamburg. The external sculptural reliefs were the work of the famous Hungarian-Jewish sculptor Ödön Beck, who vanished on 31 January 1945 during the Siege of Budapest.

One of the lesser-known architects who designed buildings in the Palotanegyed's pre-World War One boom period was another Jewish architect, Adolf Greiner (born Losoncz, now Slovakia, 1847, died Budapest 1931). He designed the Újpest synagogue, built 1885–86, and a number of inner Pest apartment buildings in the 1890s, including the four-storey building at Horánszky utca 27, built in 1892.

The Palace District contains important educational and cultural institutions. Between the Múzeum körút and Puskin utca is the Humanities Faculty of Budapest's Eötvös Loránd University, built 1880-3 by Imre Steindl, also the architect of the Parliament building. The central administration and many of the departments of the city's Semmelweis University (of medicine) occupy the block between Üllöi út, Baross utca, Mária utca and Szentkirályi utca. They had appeared on maps by 1896 and are of a similar style to the nearby Eötvös Loránd University buildings. In addition, the Semmelweis University's Faculty of Health Sciences and the Hungarian Society of Therapists are housed in the former sanatorium and medicinal baths at Vas utca 17 (see photo).

The Pázmány Péter Catholic University occupies two buildings on Szentkirályi utca and is in the process of expanding into the block bounded by Pollack Mihály tér, Múzeum utca, Szentkirályi utca and Bródy Sándor utca. This will involve a major new building, restoration and use of the Eszterházy and Károlyi Palaces and integration into the university of the former Hungarian radio headquarters on Bródy Sándor utca. Another part of the university’s campus is the charming 1850s now-restored ‘Chimneysweep’s House’ (‘keménysepröház’). The Pázmány Péter university’s expansionin the Palace District has involved the demolition of two unsympathetic communist-era Hungarian Radio buildings on Pollack Mihály tér.

The German-language Andrássy University Budapest is housed in the Festetics Palace.

The Arts and Humanities Faculty of the Károli Gáspár University of the Reformed Church of Hungary is housed in the former Károlyi palaces between Reviczky utca and Múzeum utca.

Schools in the district include the Széchenyi School of Trade on Vas utca, the Eötvös Loránd University Trefort Ágoston teacher-practicing High School on Trefort utca, and three on Horánszky utca – the Benda Kálmán Arts and Social Sciences College (part of the Károli Gáspár University); the Vörösmarty Mihály Gimnázium the Saint Ignatius Jesuit College.

The main church in the district is the mainly neo-Romanesque Jézus Szíve templom (Church of the Sacred Heart), on Lőrinc pap tér, which was built 1880–1890 to the designs of József Kauser. Kauser also completed the spectacular interior of the Basilica after Miklós Ybl died in 1891 and designed the south-eastern quarter of the Kódály körönd, the magnificent quartet of residential palaces on Andrássy út between Oktogon and Heroes’ Square. The area around the Jézus Szíve templom has long been known as the ‘little Vatican’ for its numerous institutions connected with the Catholic Church. These include the Jézus Szíve Jezsuita lélkeszség (the Society of Jesus Convent) at Mária utca 25, the Kollégium Teréziánum of the Miasszonyunkról Nevezett Kalocsai Iskolanővérek Társulata (Terezianum College (student dormitory) of the Society of Our Lady Sisters of Kalocsa School at Mária utca 20 and several in Horánszky utca: the Saint Ignatius Jesuit College mentioned above (18); the Divine Saviour's Sisters Saint Anna College (Isteni Megváltóról Nevezett Nővérek Szent Anna Collégiuma)(17); the 1912 Párbeszédháza, the House of Dialogue, the Jesuits' spiritual and cultural centre in Budapest(20) (handed after the communist regime's dissolution of the Jesuit order to the Karl Marx University; ‘the ruined building was returned to the Jesuit order and the order had the building renovated by its hundredth anniversary’); and the Jézus Szíve társasága egyetemi szakkolegiuma (during World War II the Jézus Szive Népleanyok Társasága (Sacred Heart Society of Folkgirls) was at this address) (14).

These institutions played a heroic role in helping persecuted Jews after the German occupation of Hungary in March 1944. The sisters of the Saint Anna College gave refuge to Jewish girls while the Sacred Heart Society of Folkgirls issued protective documents. The convent in Mária utca hid Jewish men, while the House of Dialogue, according to the plaque outside, ‘hid almost forty deserters and 120 Jews away in the basement and then helped them escape abroad.’

The 1877 Rabbinical Seminary and Budapest University of Jewish Studies on Gutenberg tér (Országos Rabbiképző – Zsidó Egyetem and Alapítvány a Zsidó Egyetemért) is the world's oldest institution where rabbis graduate. It also contains a synagogue. Its construction was financed by the Emperor and King Franz Joseph, and was originally named after him. (He visited it a month after its opening in November 1877). After the German occupation of Hungary in March 1944, the rabbinical institute was seized by the SS and turned into a prison. Adolf Eichmann used it as a base to organise the deportation of Hungarian Jews, mainly to Auschwitz.

According to the Wikipedia article on the institute, an important part of its library was seized by the Nazis. ‘3000 books were dispatched to Prague, where Eichmann planned the construction of a "Museum of an extinct race" in the former Jewish quarter. Only in the 1980s were the books discovered in the cellar of the Jewish Museum of Prague and brought back to Budapest in 1989. ‘The library remains a source of pride for the university. It is considered one of the most important collections of Jewish theological literature outside Israel.’ During the communist period, the rabbinical seminary in Budapest, uniquely in Eastern Europe, continued to operate, attracting students from across the region, including the Soviet Union.

In addition to the main cultural institutions in the Palace District – the National Museum and the Szabó Ervin Library – the Uránia Cinema, at Rákóczy út 21, is also noteworthy. Designed by Henrik Schmahl in a hybrid Venetian Gothic-Moorish style, it opened in the mid-1890s initially as a cabaret theatre. Restored in 2002 to its original glory, four years later the Uránia was awarded the European Union's heritage protection prize, Europa Nostra, for outstanding restoration.

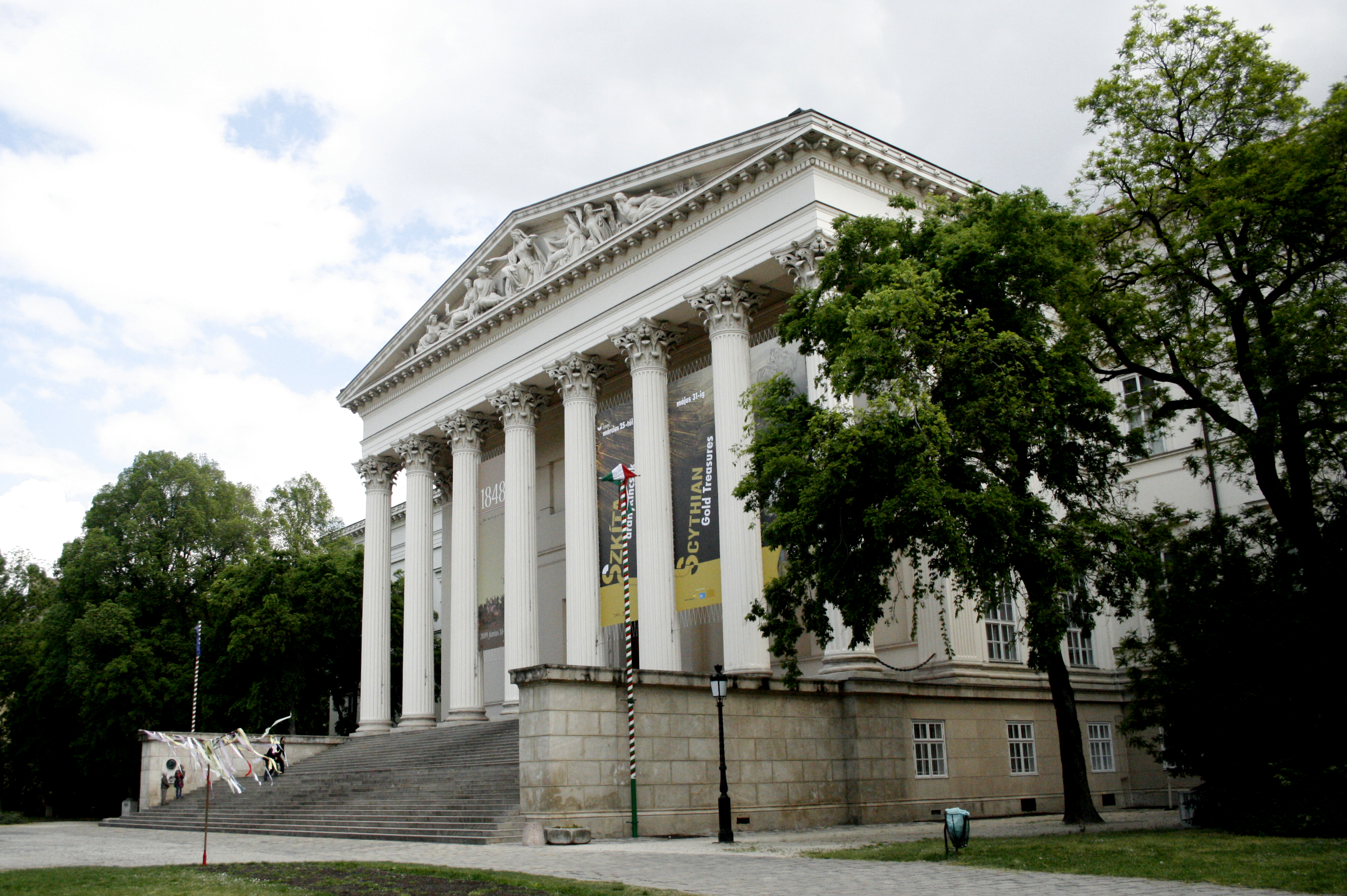
The National Museum (1837-47), Múzeum körút 14-16

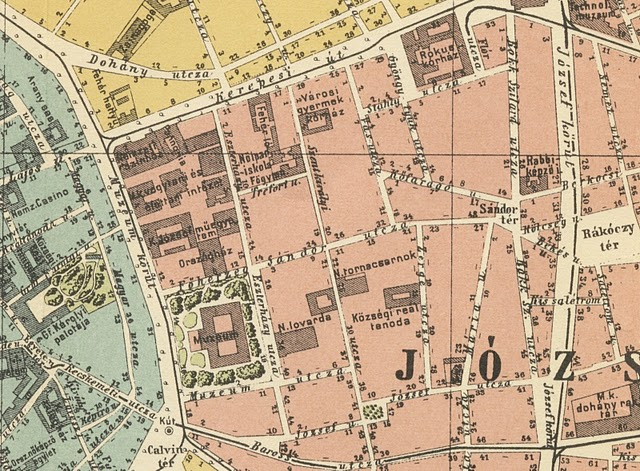
1896 street map of the Palotanegyed

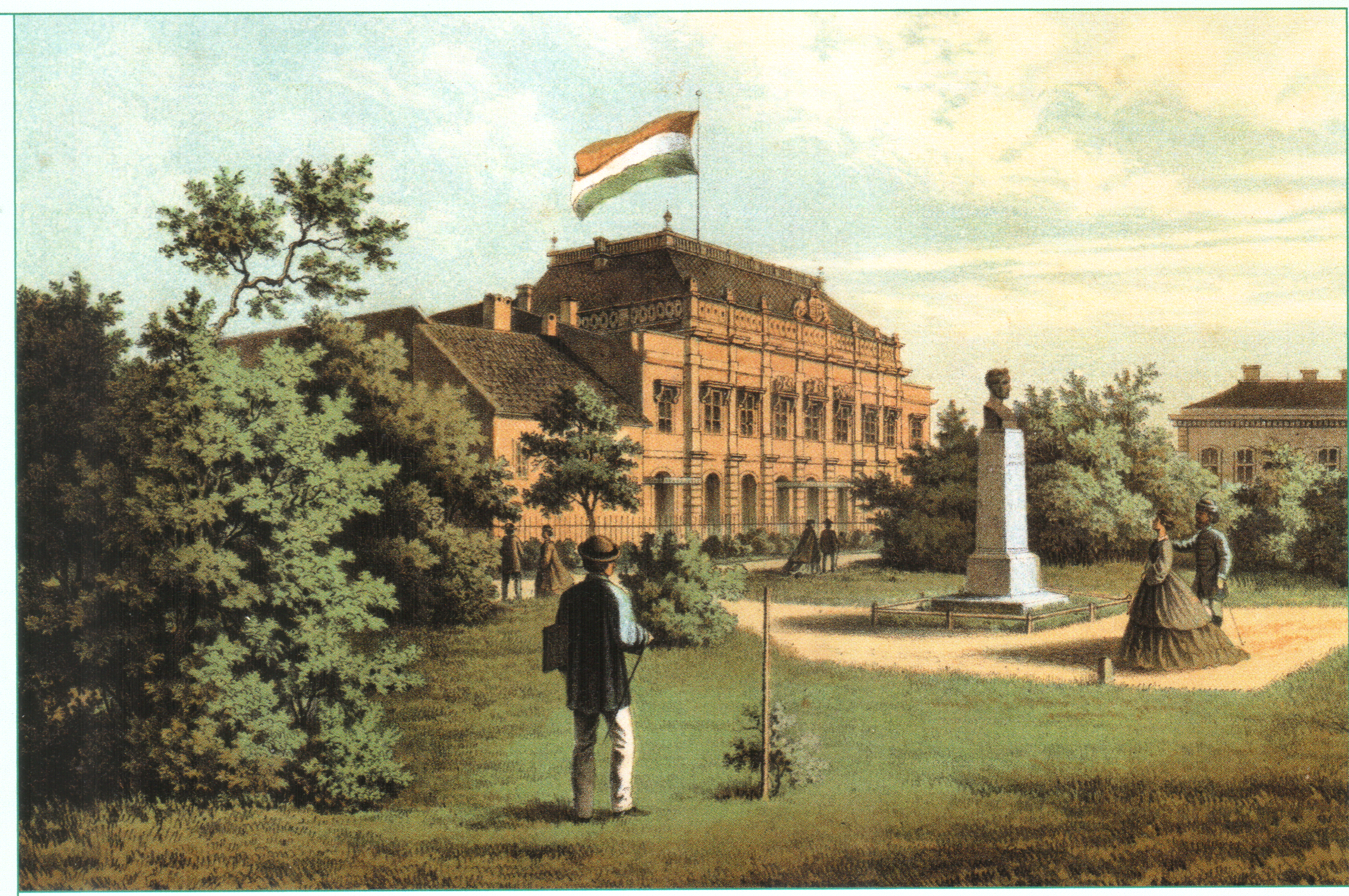
The Old Parliament (Régi Képviselőház) (1866), Bródy Sándor utca 8

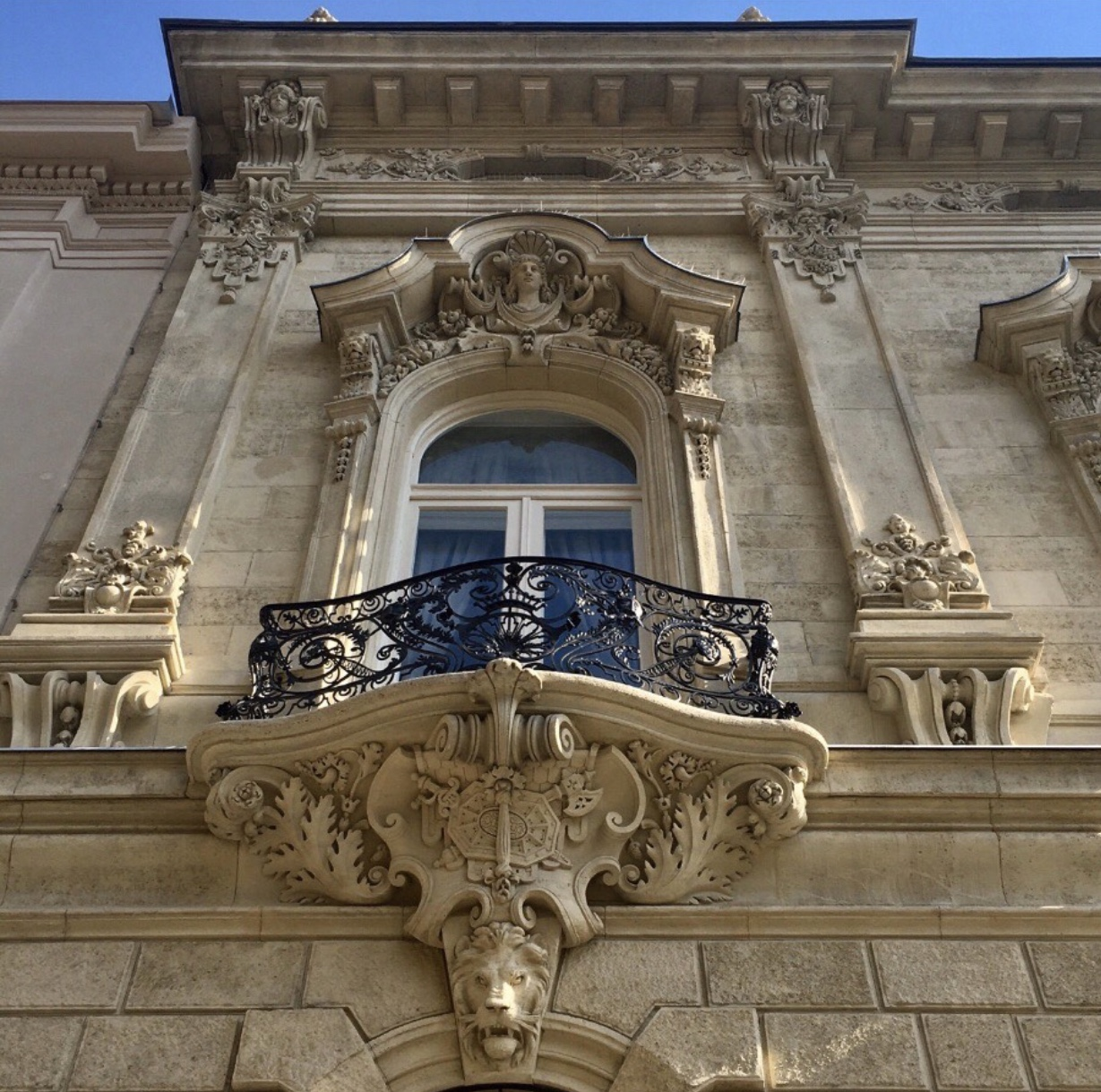
Károlyi Palace, Múzeum utca. One of the four Károlyi Palaces in the district, known as the István Károlyi or Károlyi-Csekonics Palace (Fellner and Helmer, 1881), Múzeum utca 17. Built for Countess Károlyi, wife of Count István Károlyi.

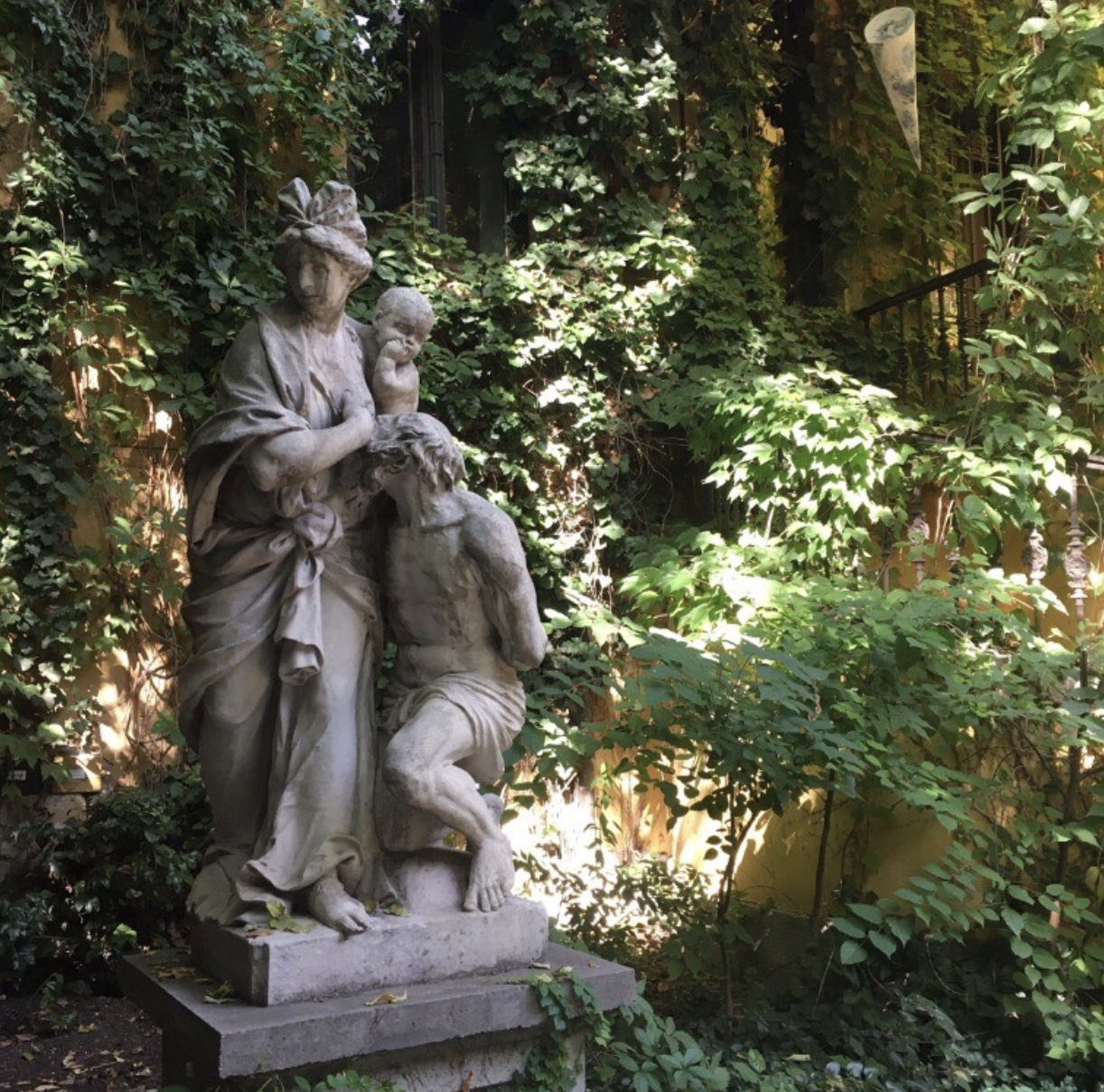
Garden of the Hungarian Association of Architects, Ötpacsirta utca

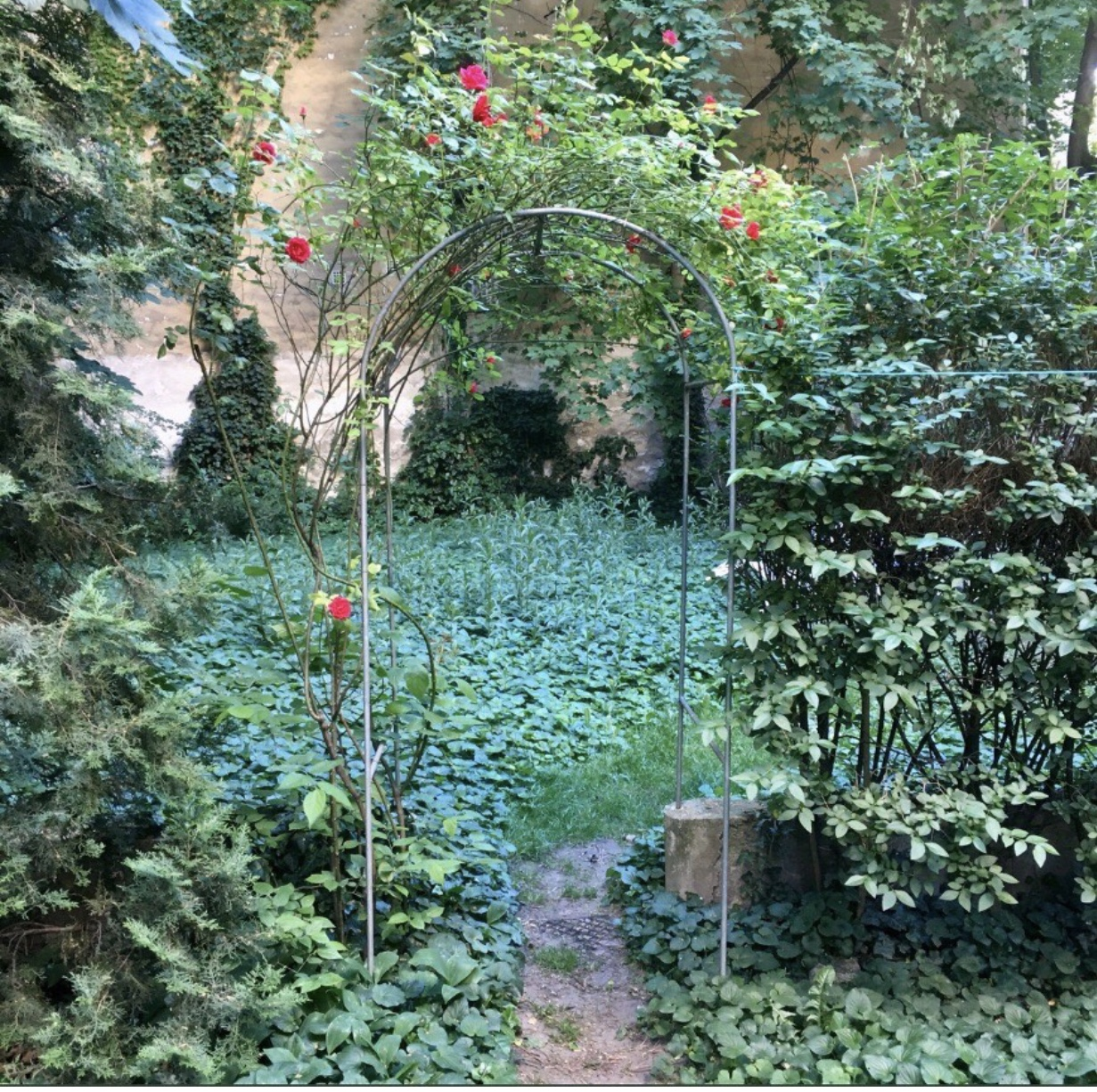
Secret garden in an inner courtyard, Horánszky utca

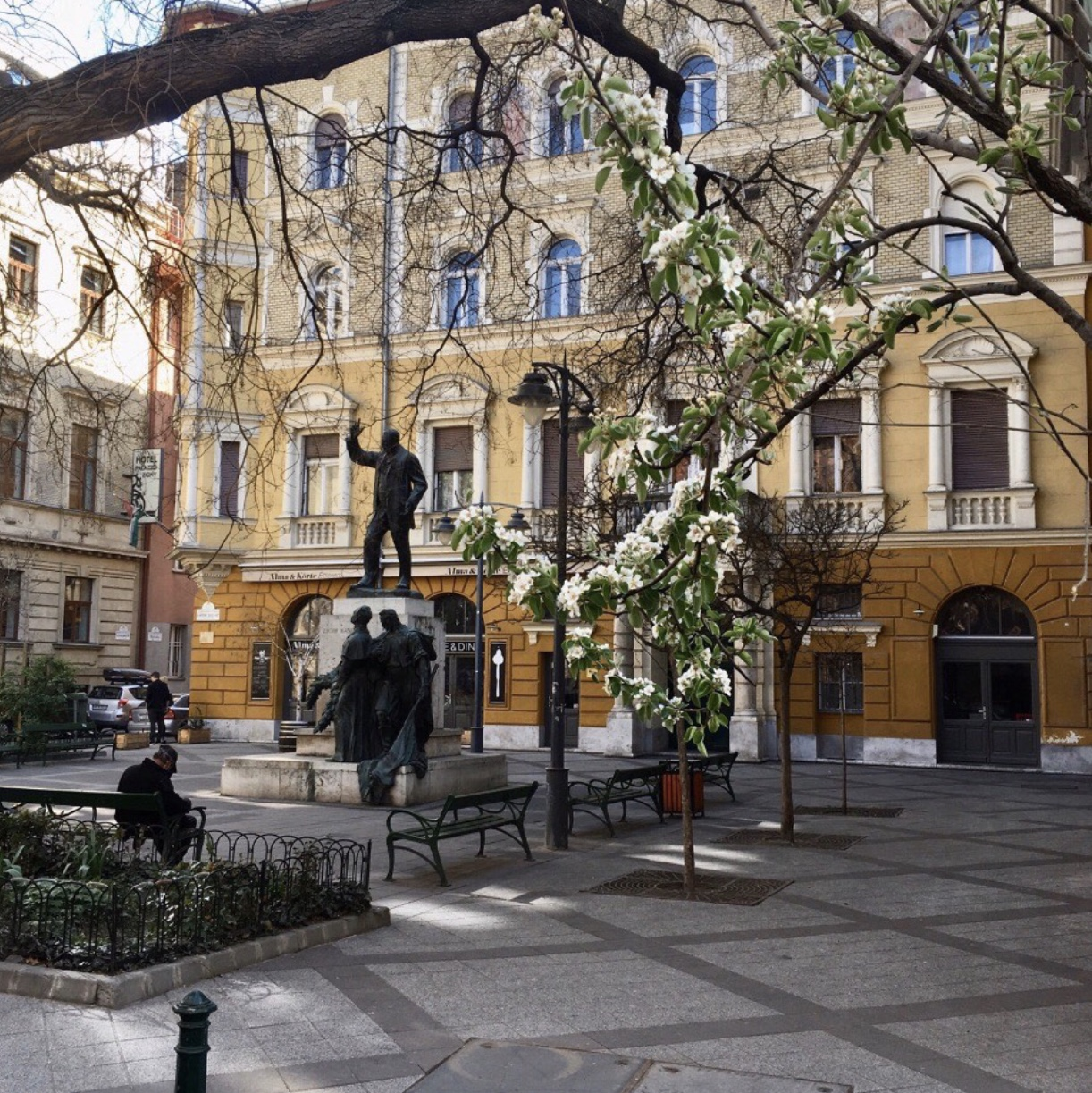
Lőrinc pap tér

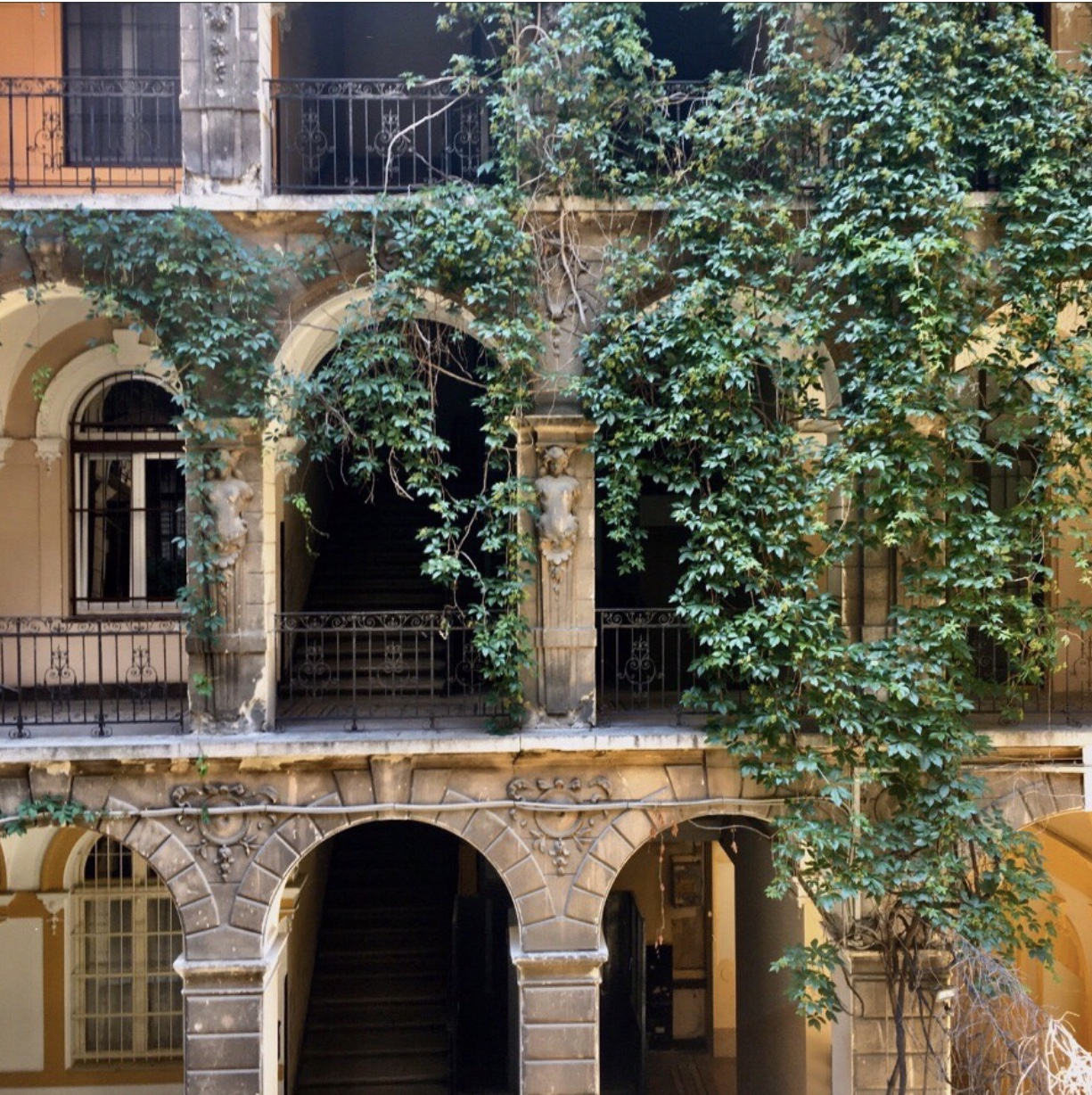
Inner courtyard, Szentkirályi utca

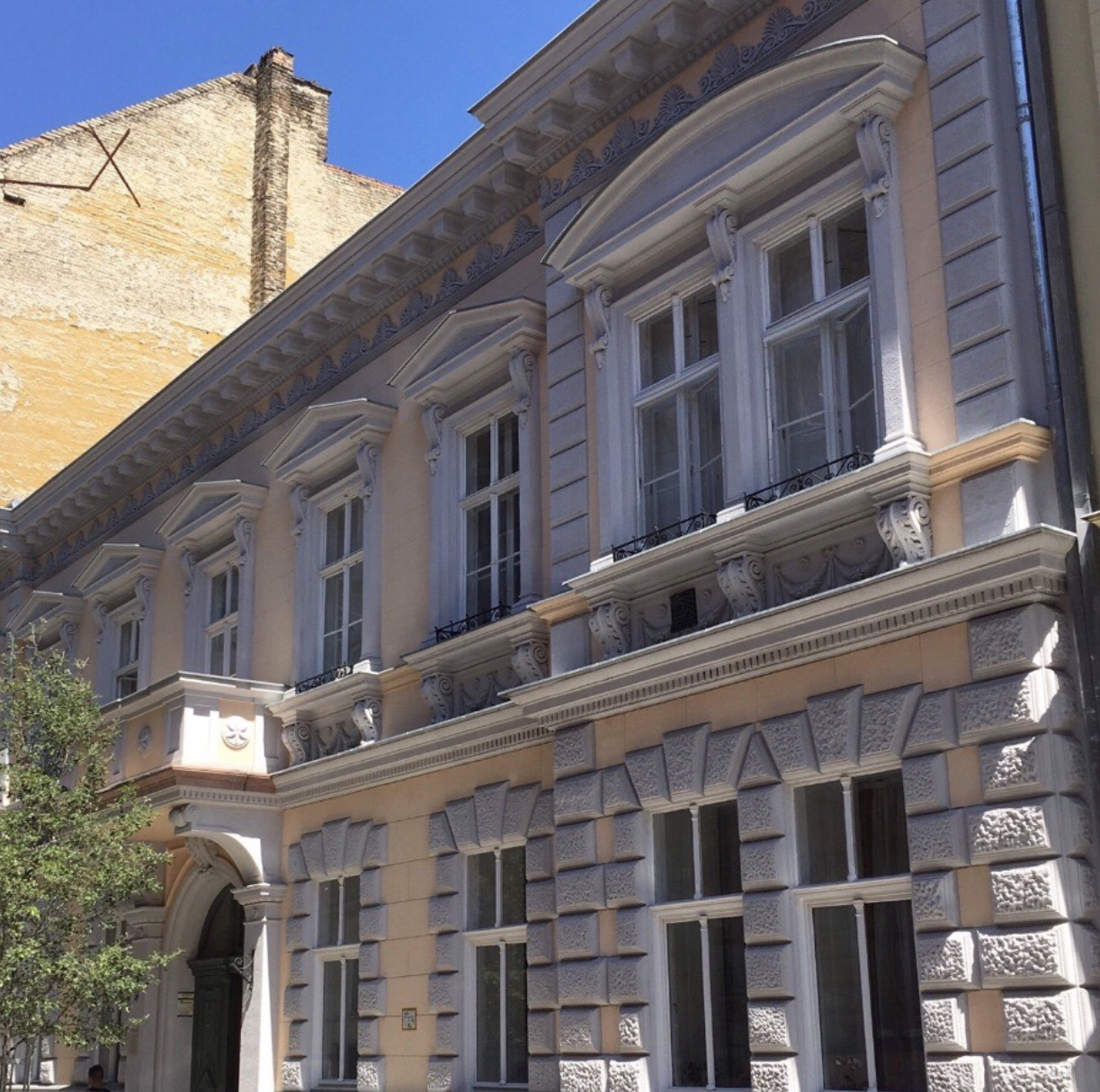
The Márffy-Mantuano Palace (1871), Horánszky utca

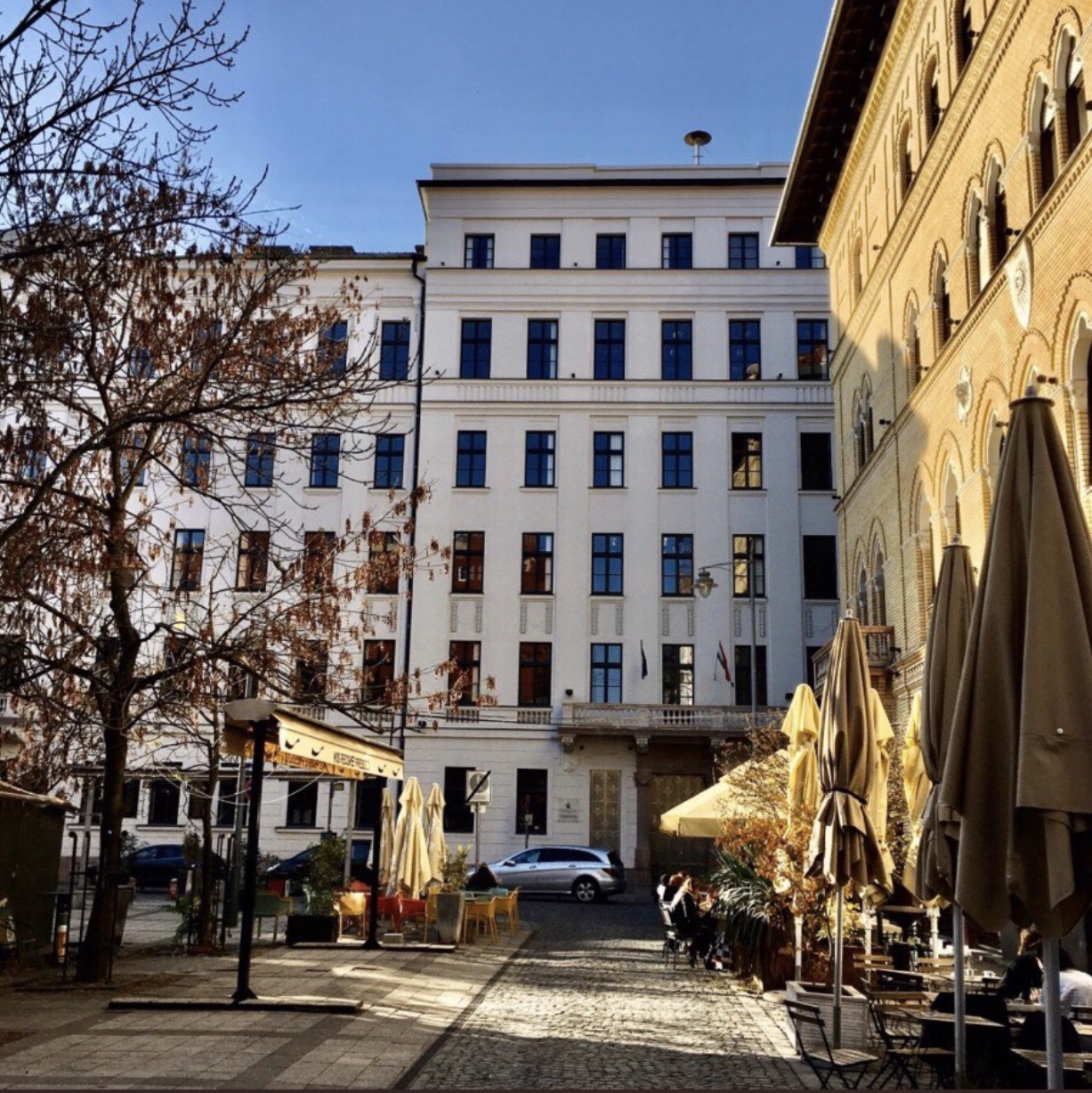
Mikszáth Kálmán tér

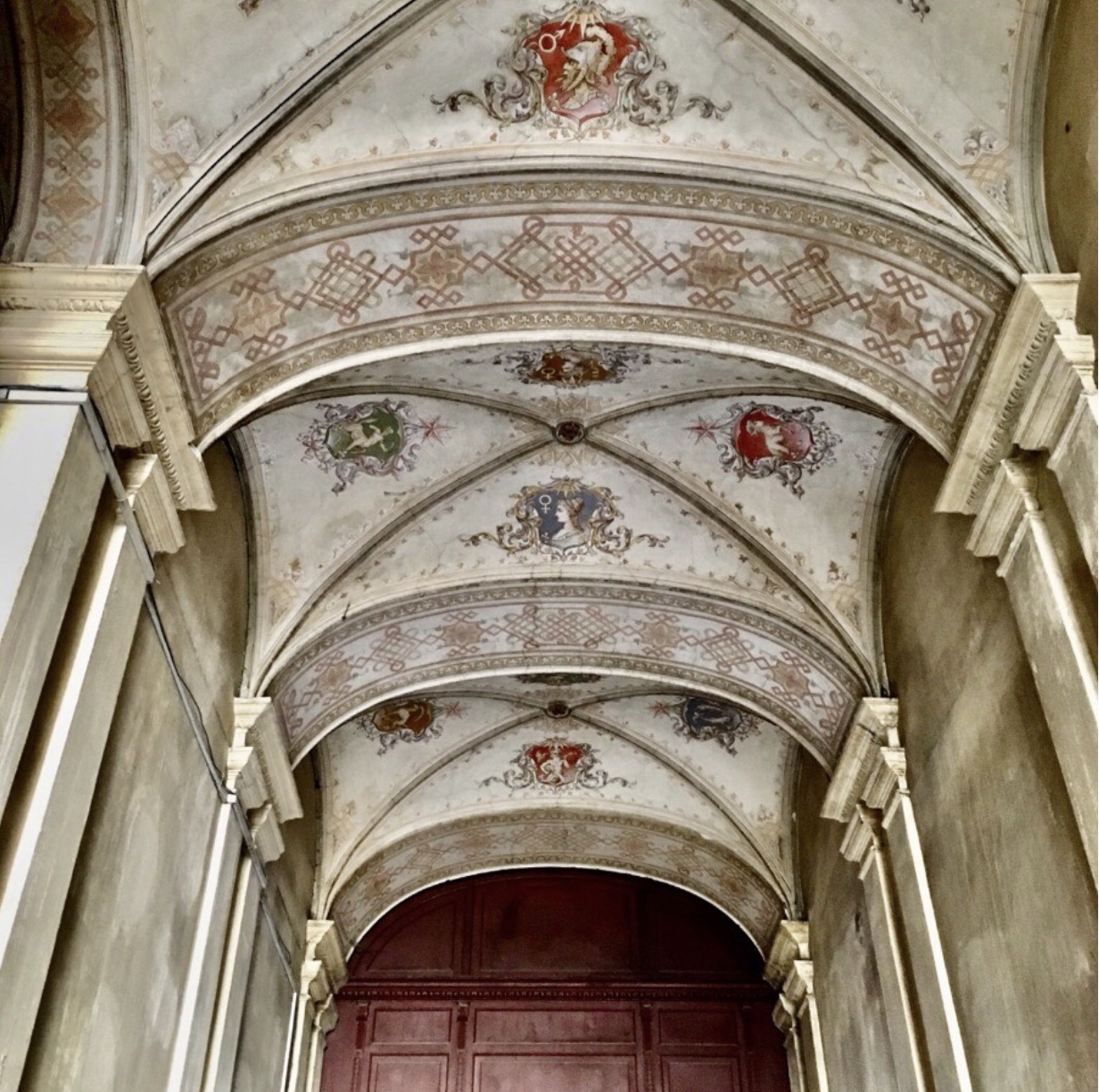
Ceiling decoration, Baross utca

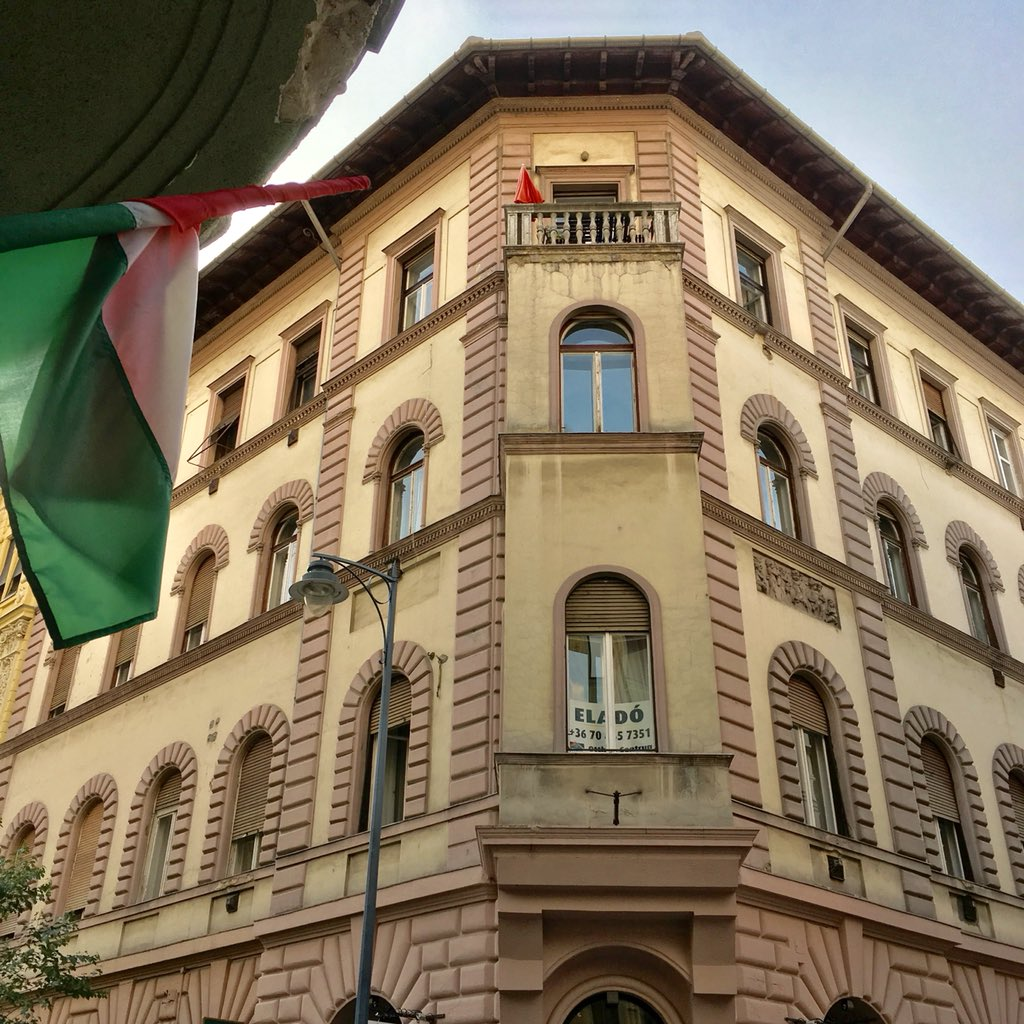
Adolf Greiner's 1892 apartment building at Horánszky utca 27. It replaced an earlier two-storey building designed in 1869 by prolific Palotanegyed architect Antal Gottgeb. At one point the building was owned by the well-known actress and operetta singer Irén Zilahy (born Káposvár 1904), who was killed in her villa at Himfy u 5 in Budapest's 11th district during a US air raid on 3 April 1944.

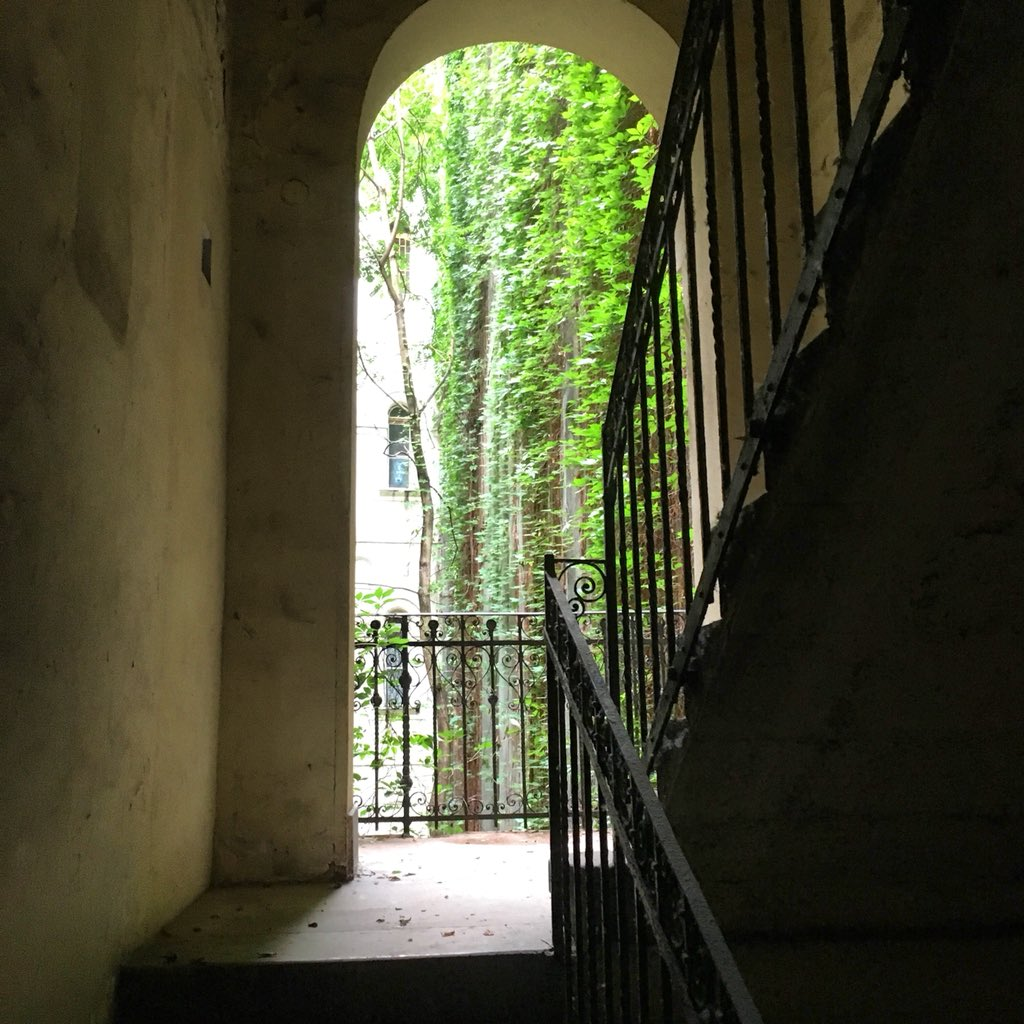
Adolf Greiner's 1892 apartment building at Horánszky utca: the servants' stairwell

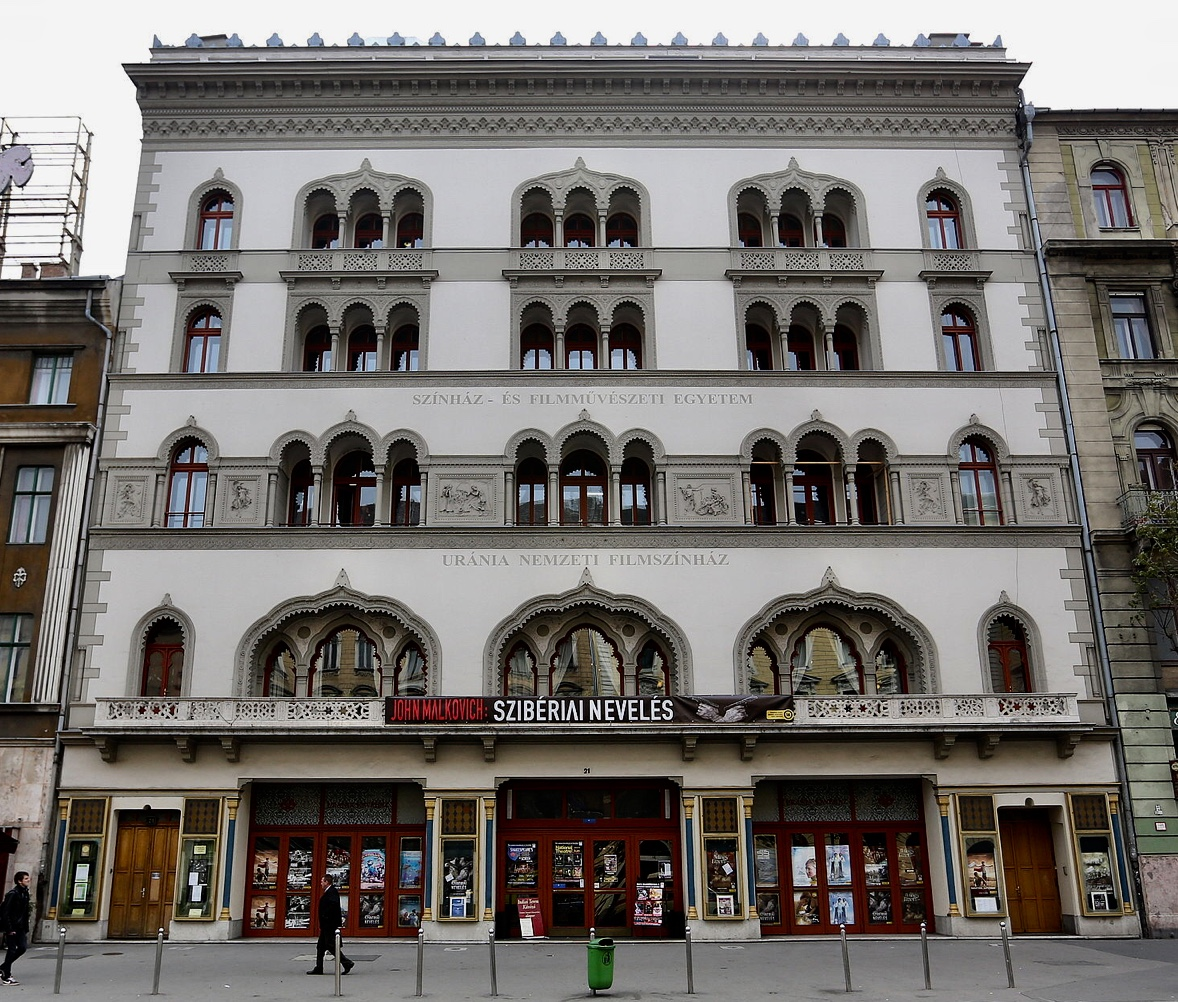
The 1890s Uránia Cinema, Rákóczy út 21

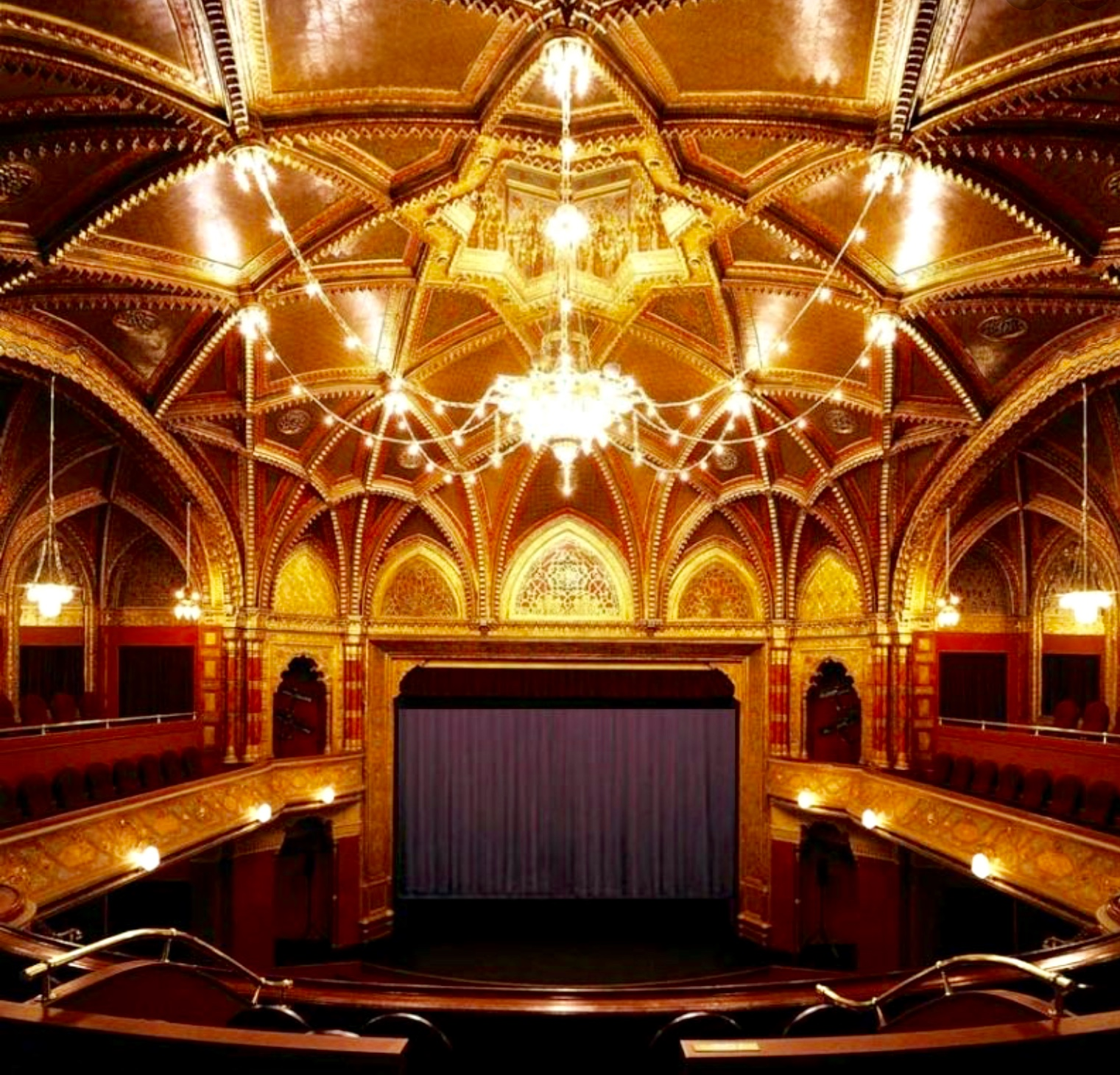
The Uránia National Film Theatre at Rákóczi út 21: one of the cinemas

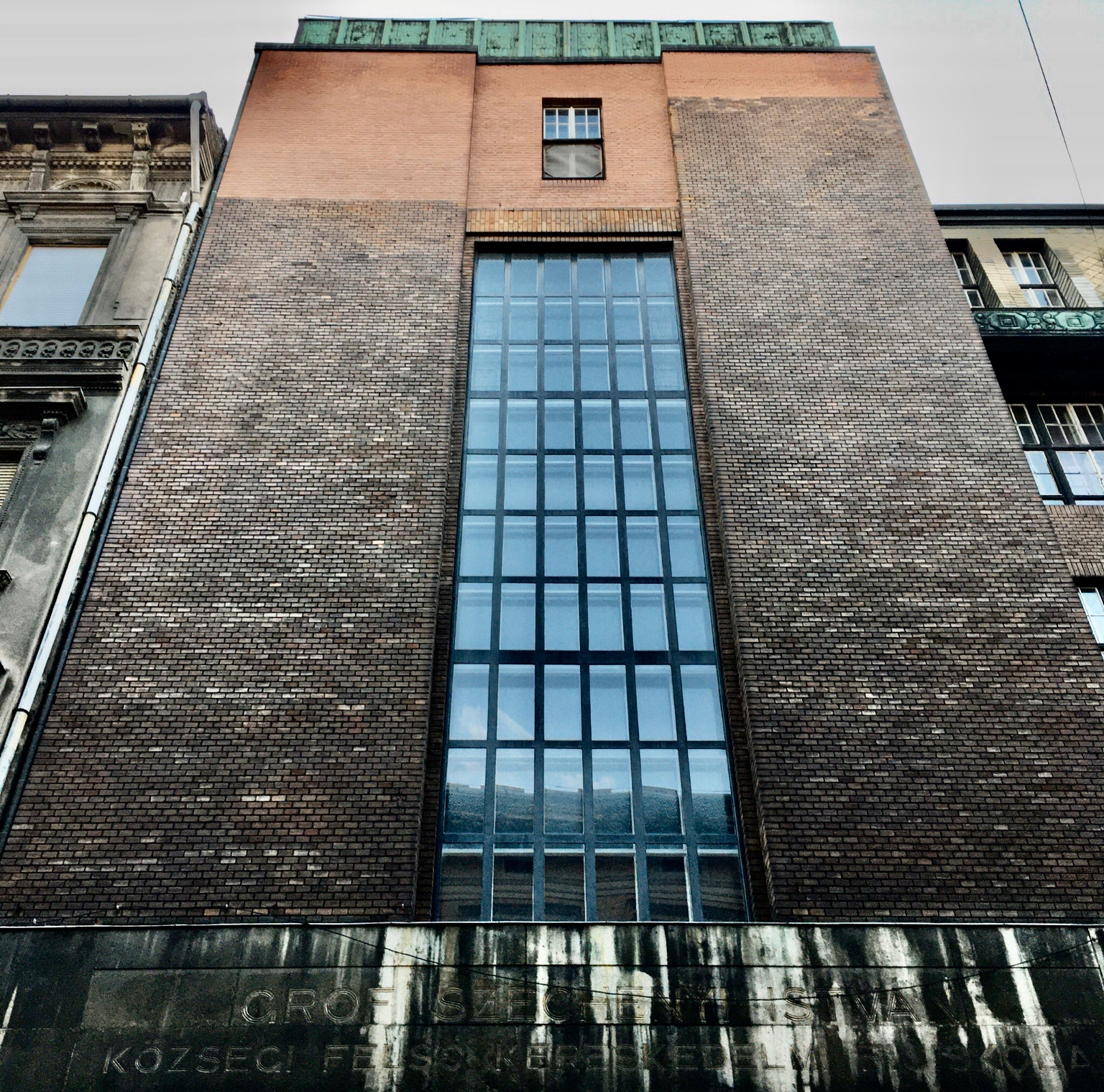
Béla Lajta's 1912 Count Széchenyi School of Trade on Vas utca

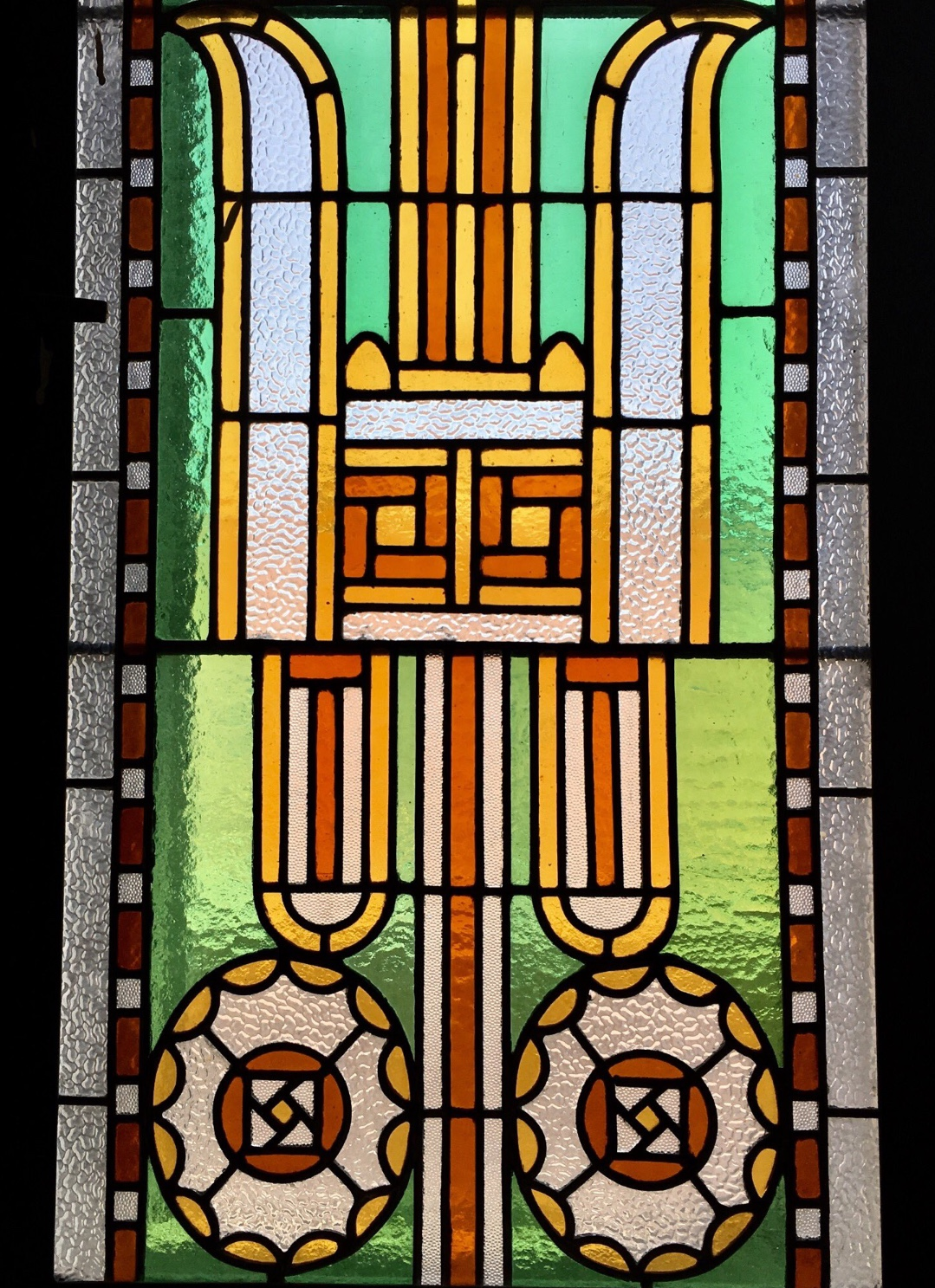
Béla Lajta's Count Széchenyi School of Trade - stained glass

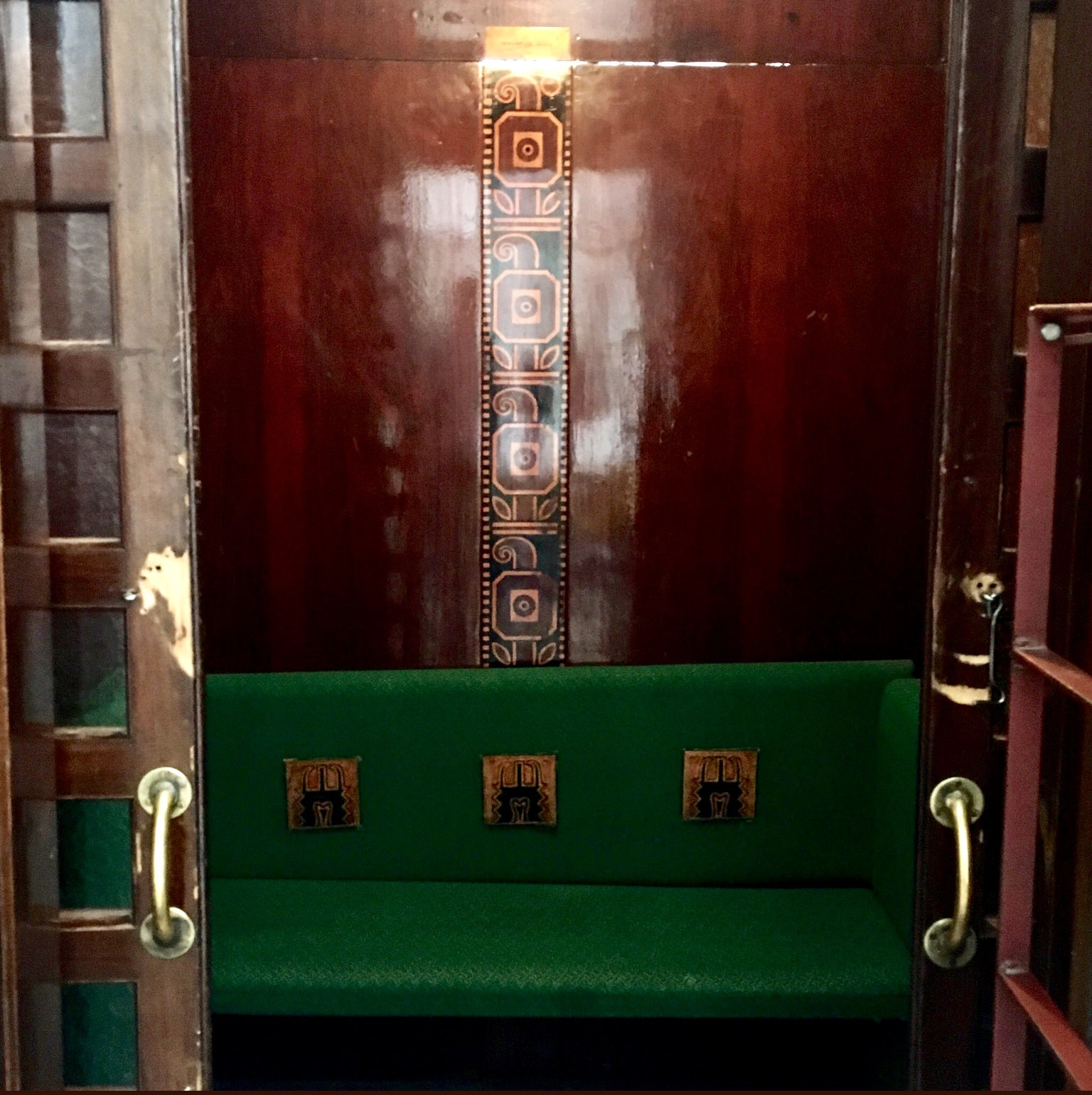
Béla Lajta's Count Széchenyi School of Trade - the lift

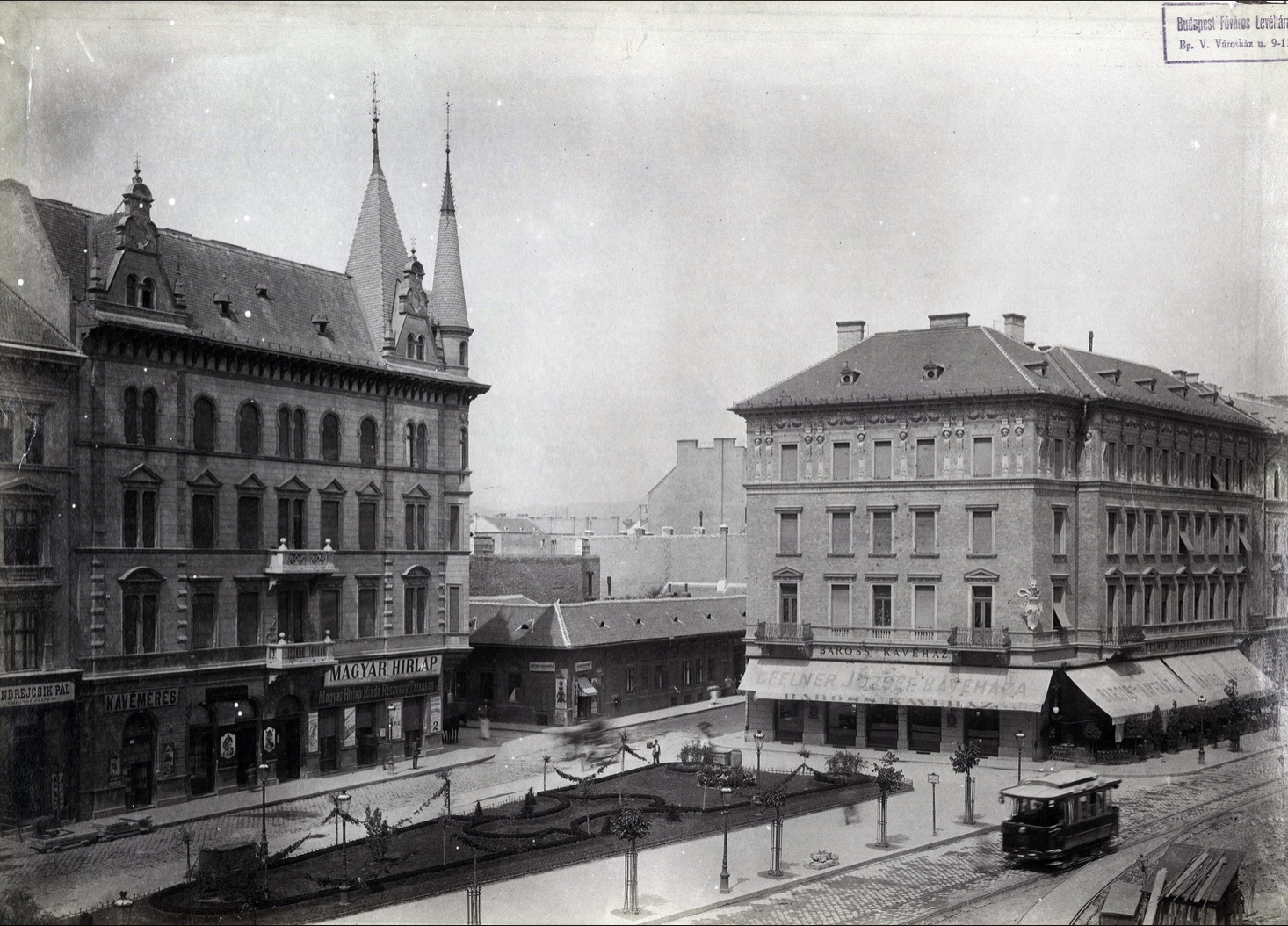
Corner of the József körút and Krúdy (then József) utca, 1898. In the building on the right was the Baross café, now a Penny Market.

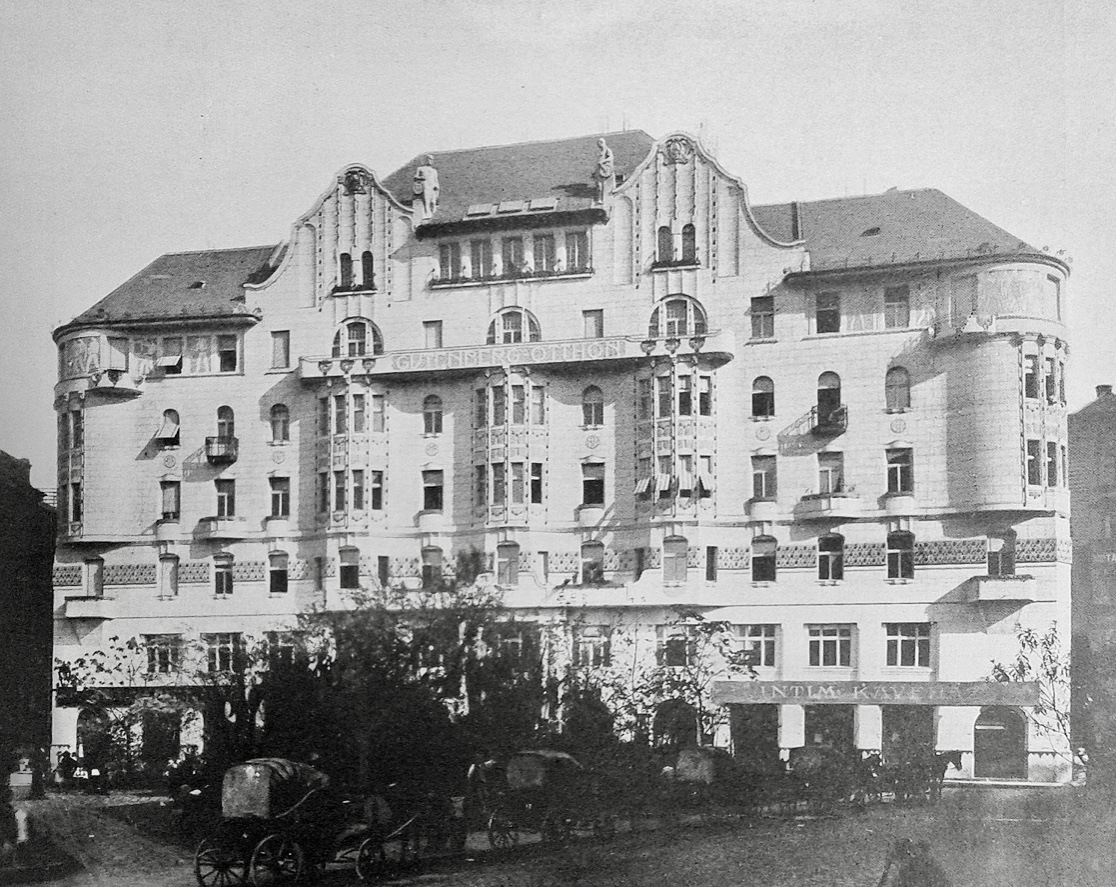
The Gutenberg Otthon, designed by József and László Vágó, and built in 1906

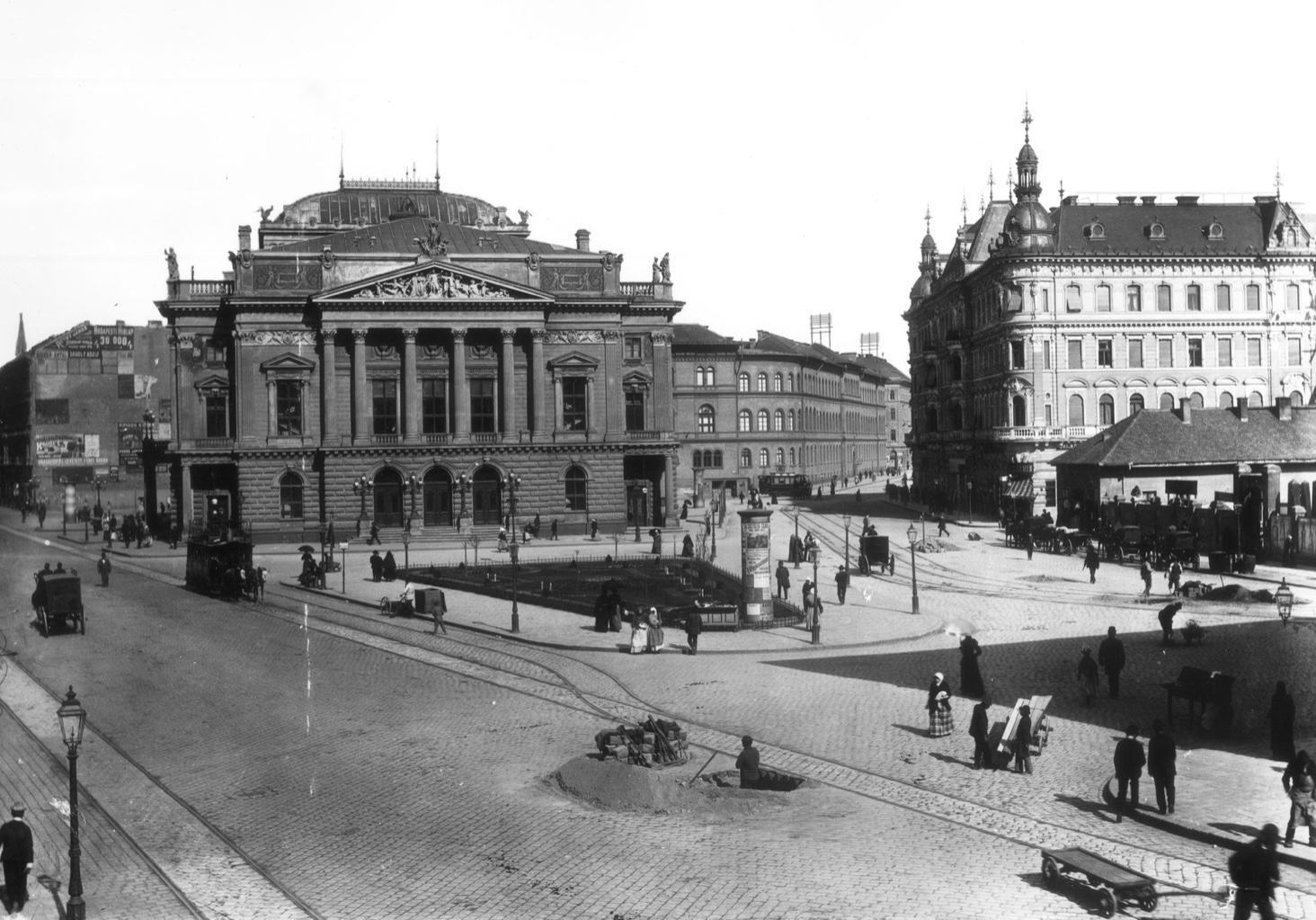
The Népszínház (People's Theatre), later National Theatre, Blaha Lujza tér, 1900

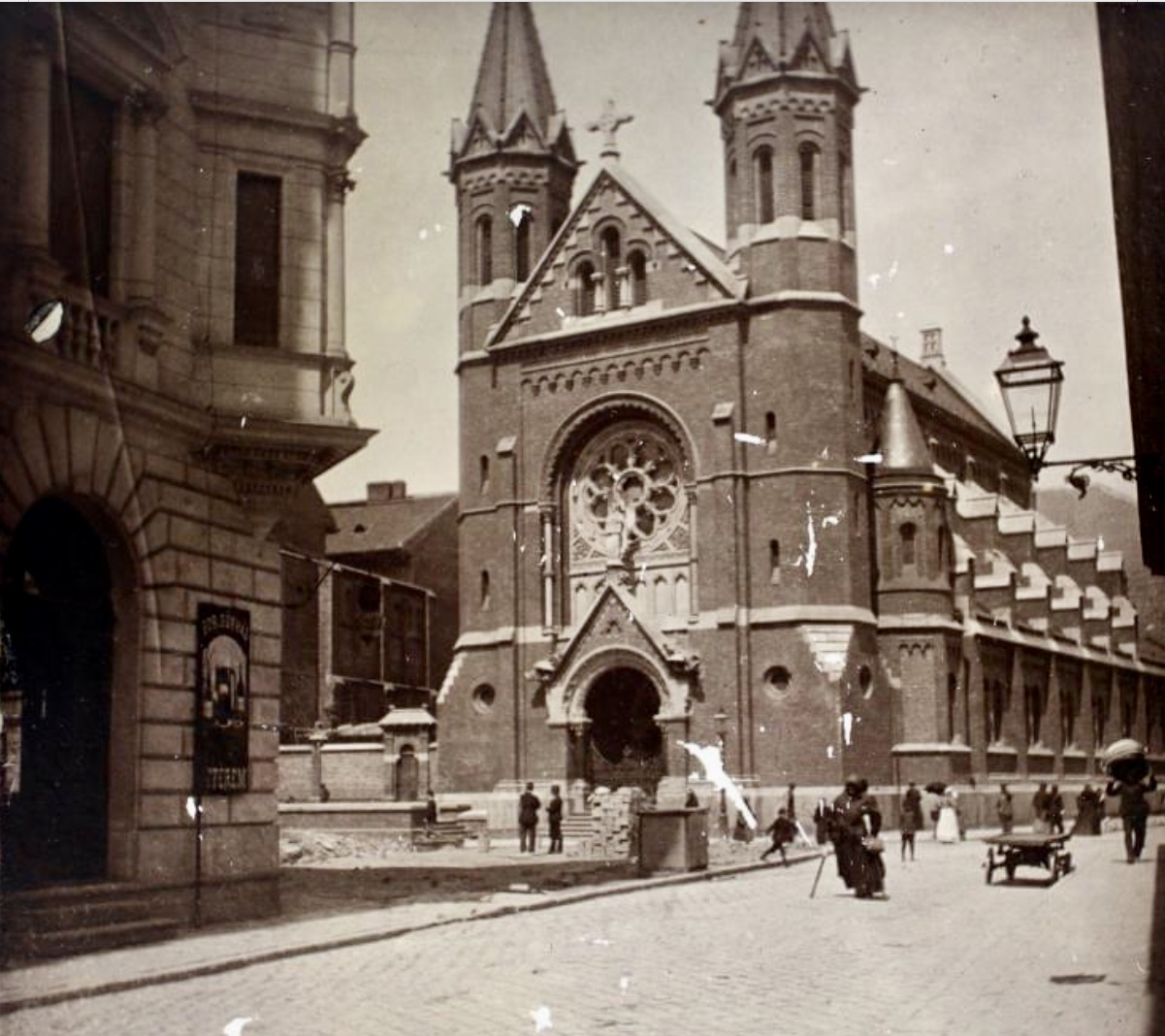
Jézus Szíve templom and Lőrinc pap tér, 1910

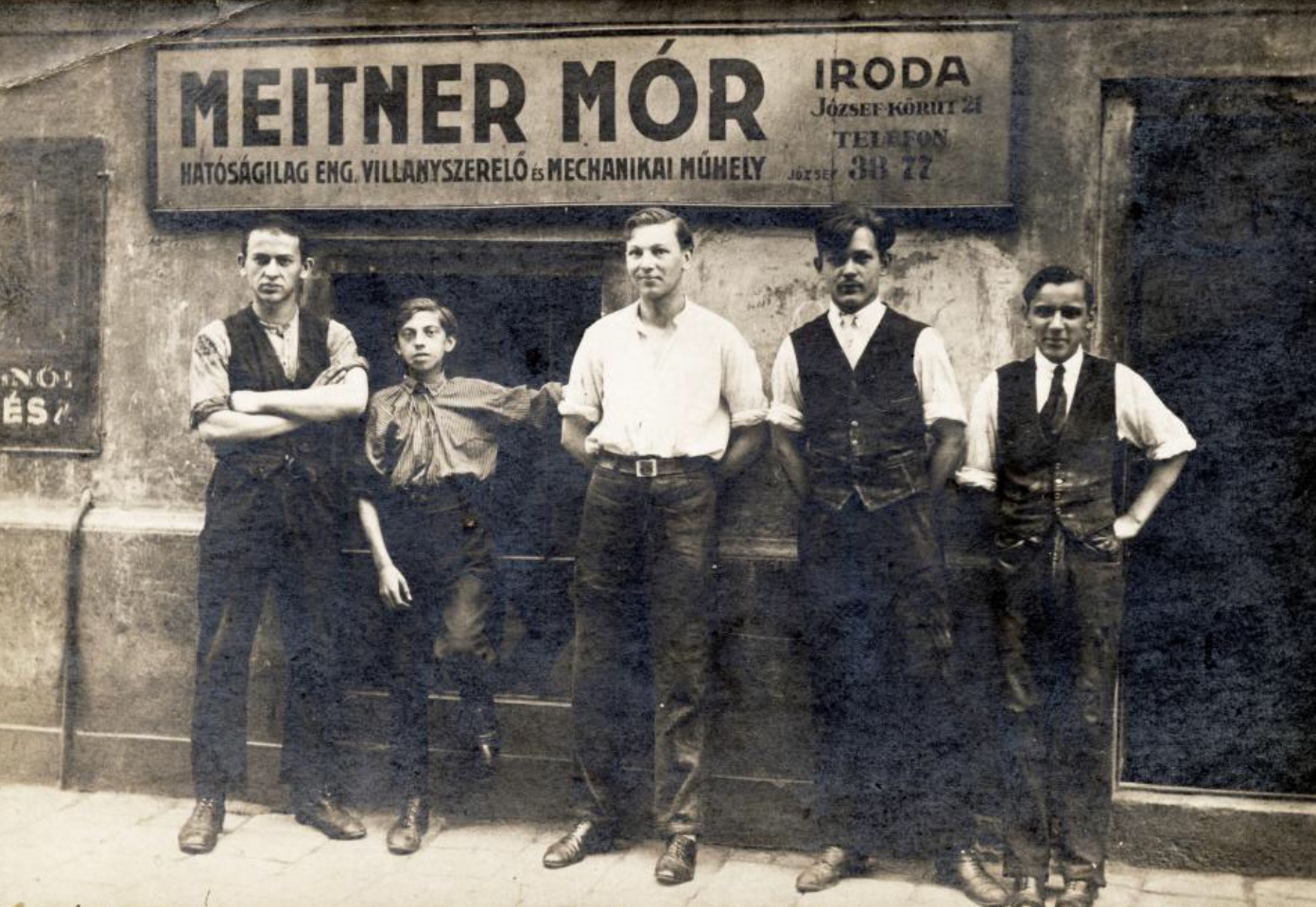
Mária utca 20, 1921

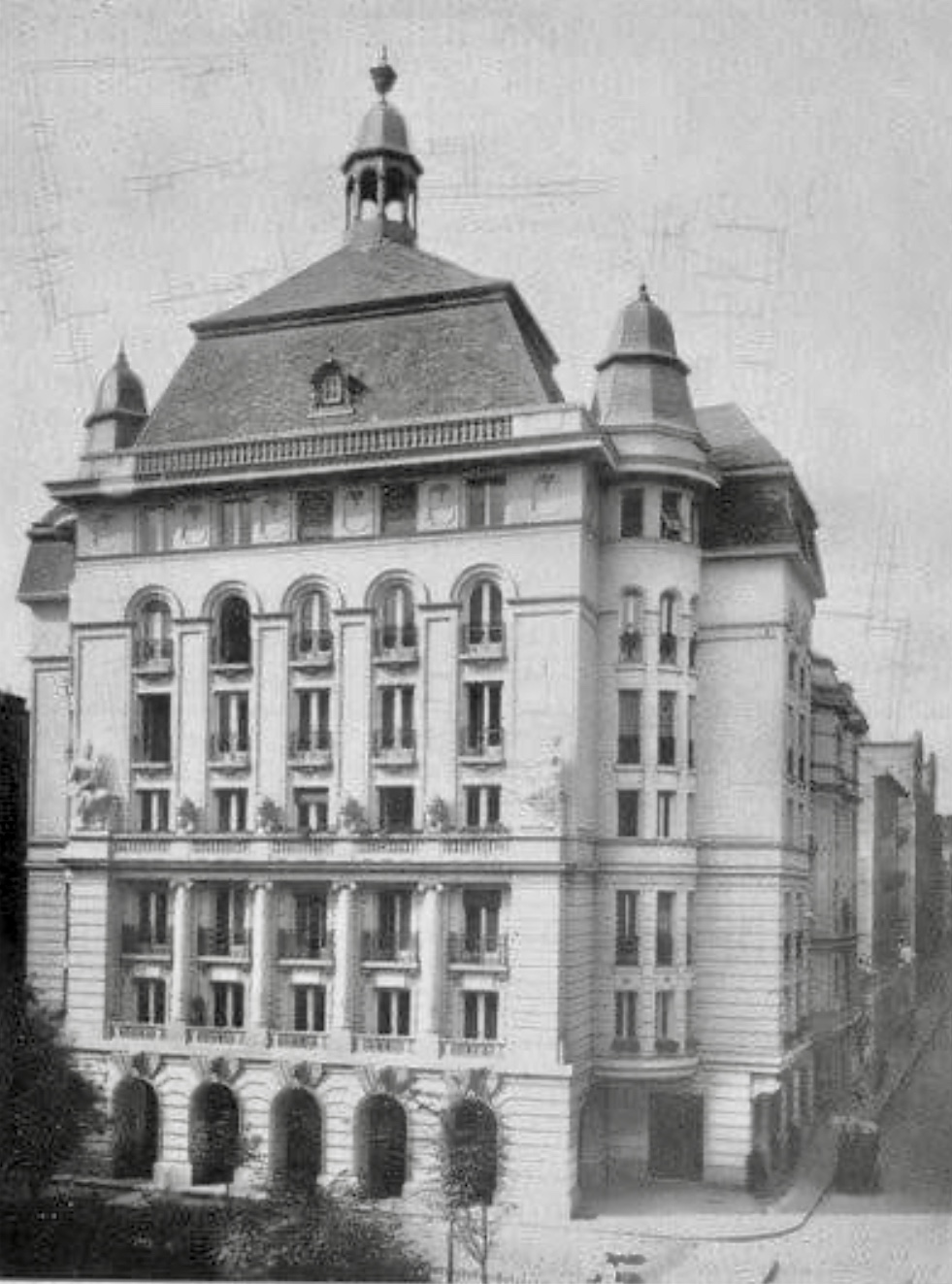
Gutenberg tér, probably 1920s

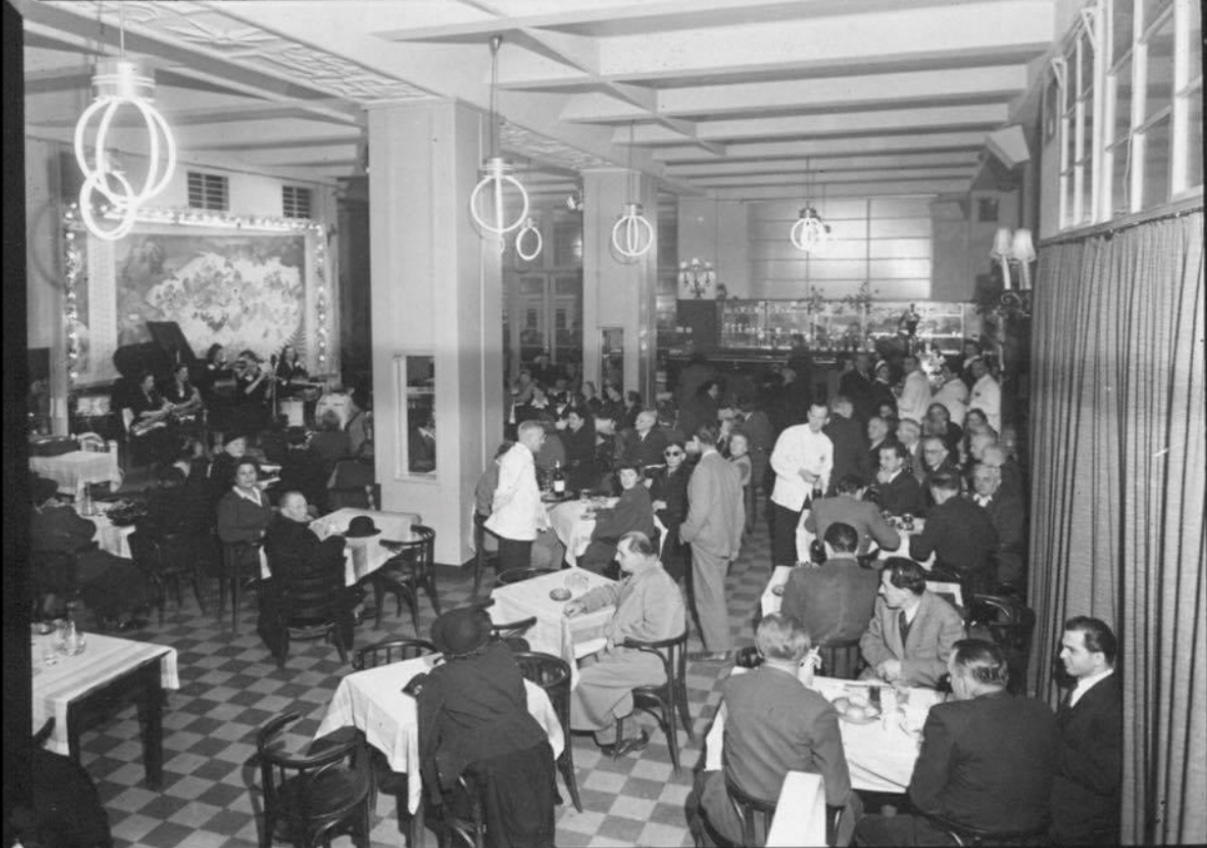
Corvin Áruház restaurant, probably 1930s

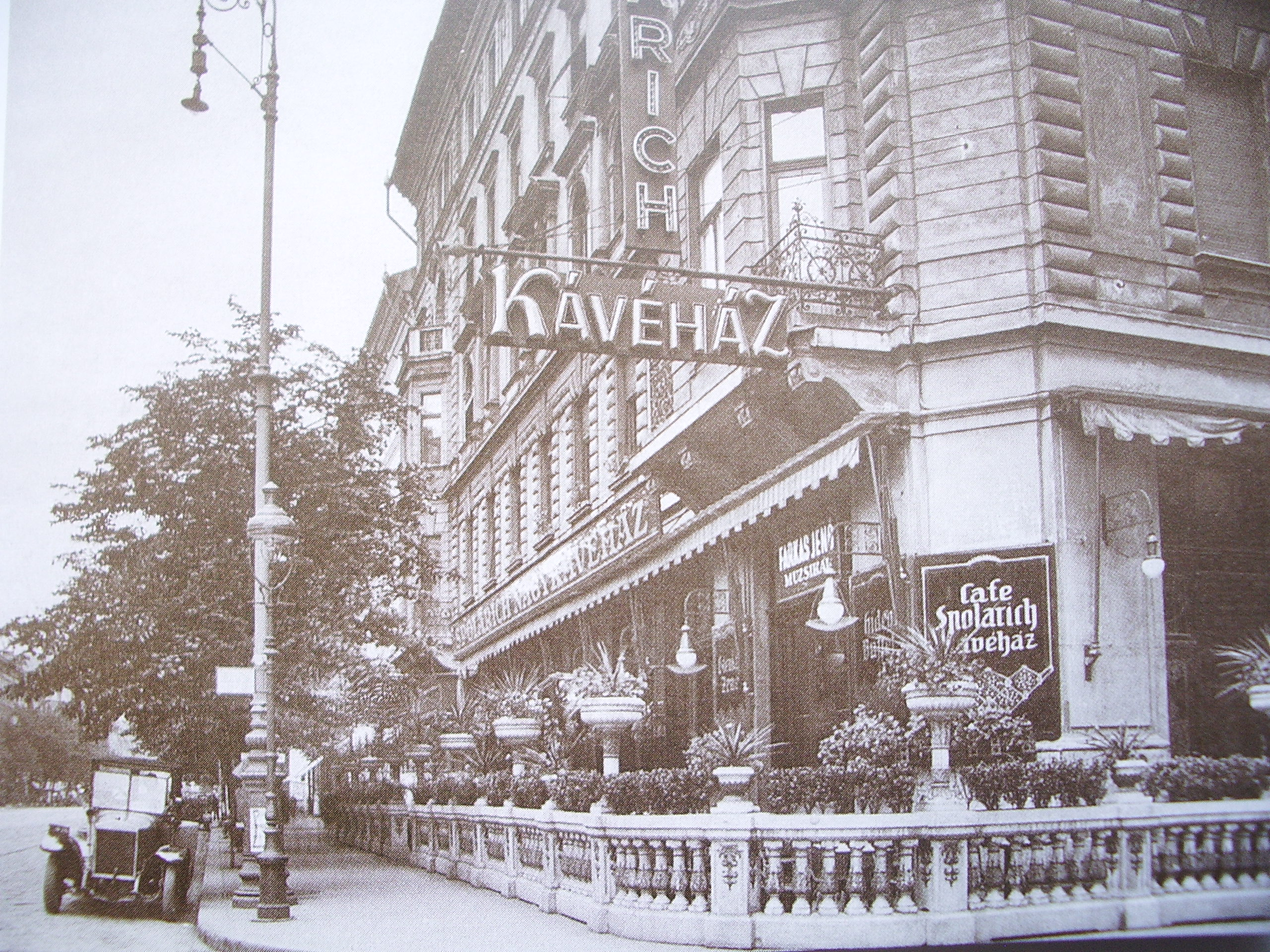
Cafe Spolarich, probably between the wars

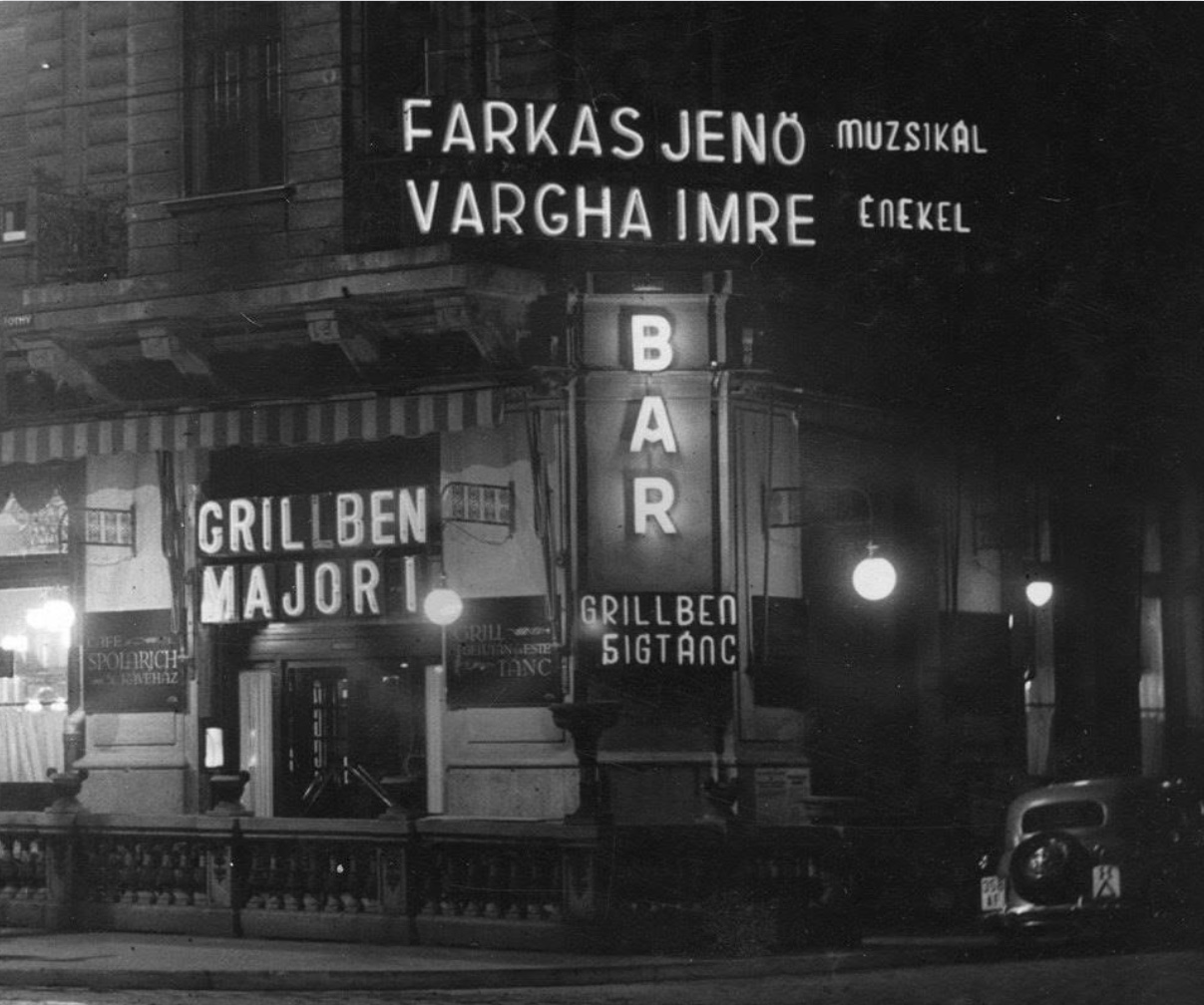
The Spolarich Café, 37-39 József körút, 1934

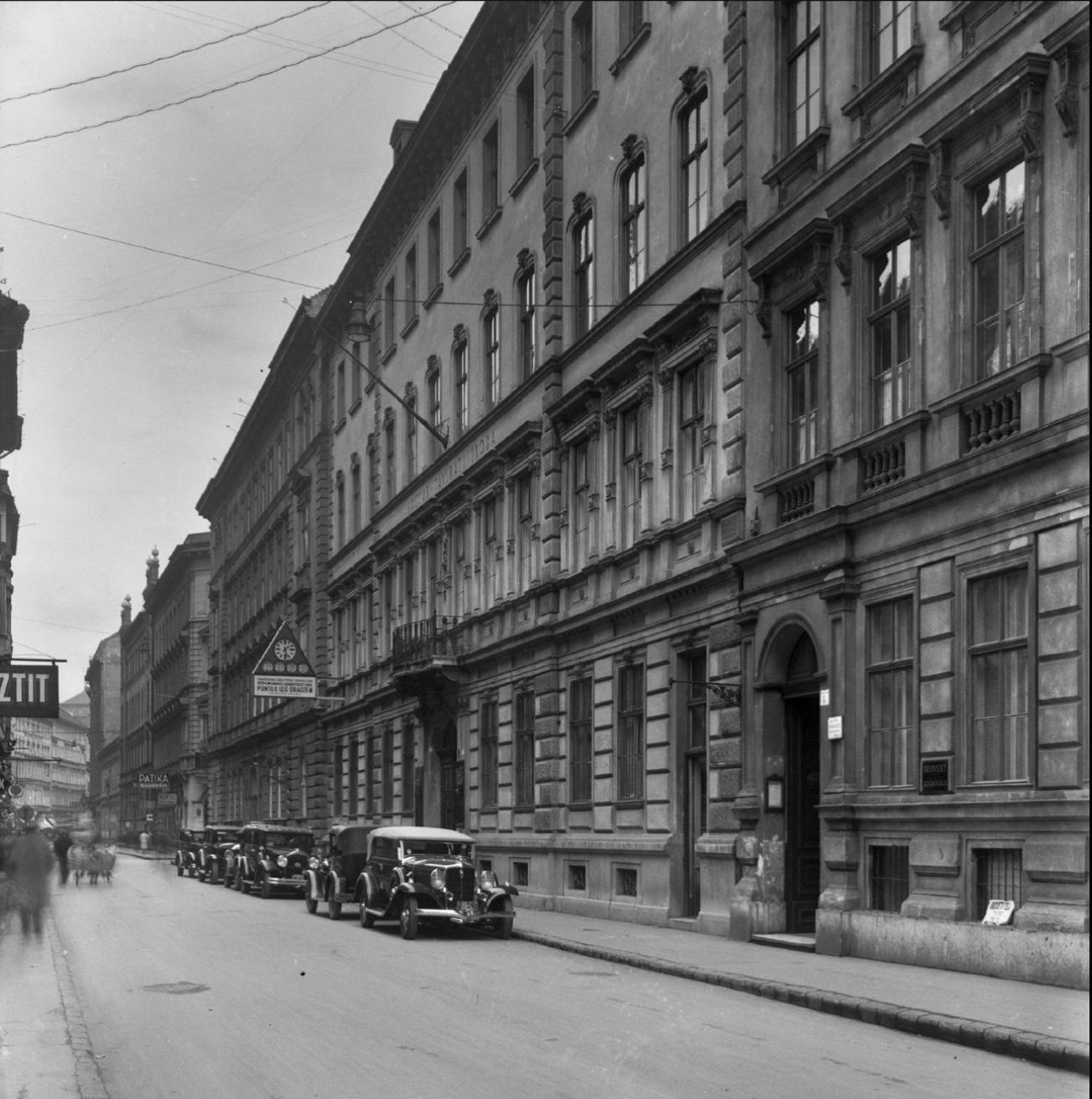
Főherceg Sándor (now Bródy Sándor utca) in 1934

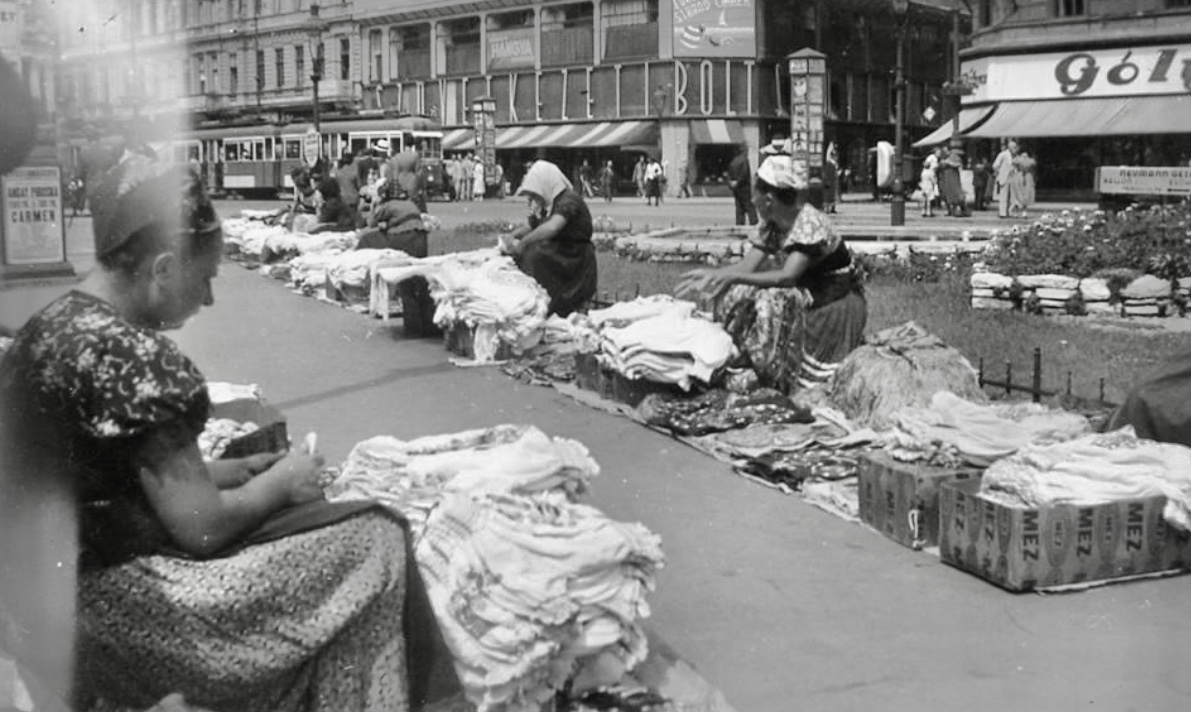
Blaha Lujza tér, 1937

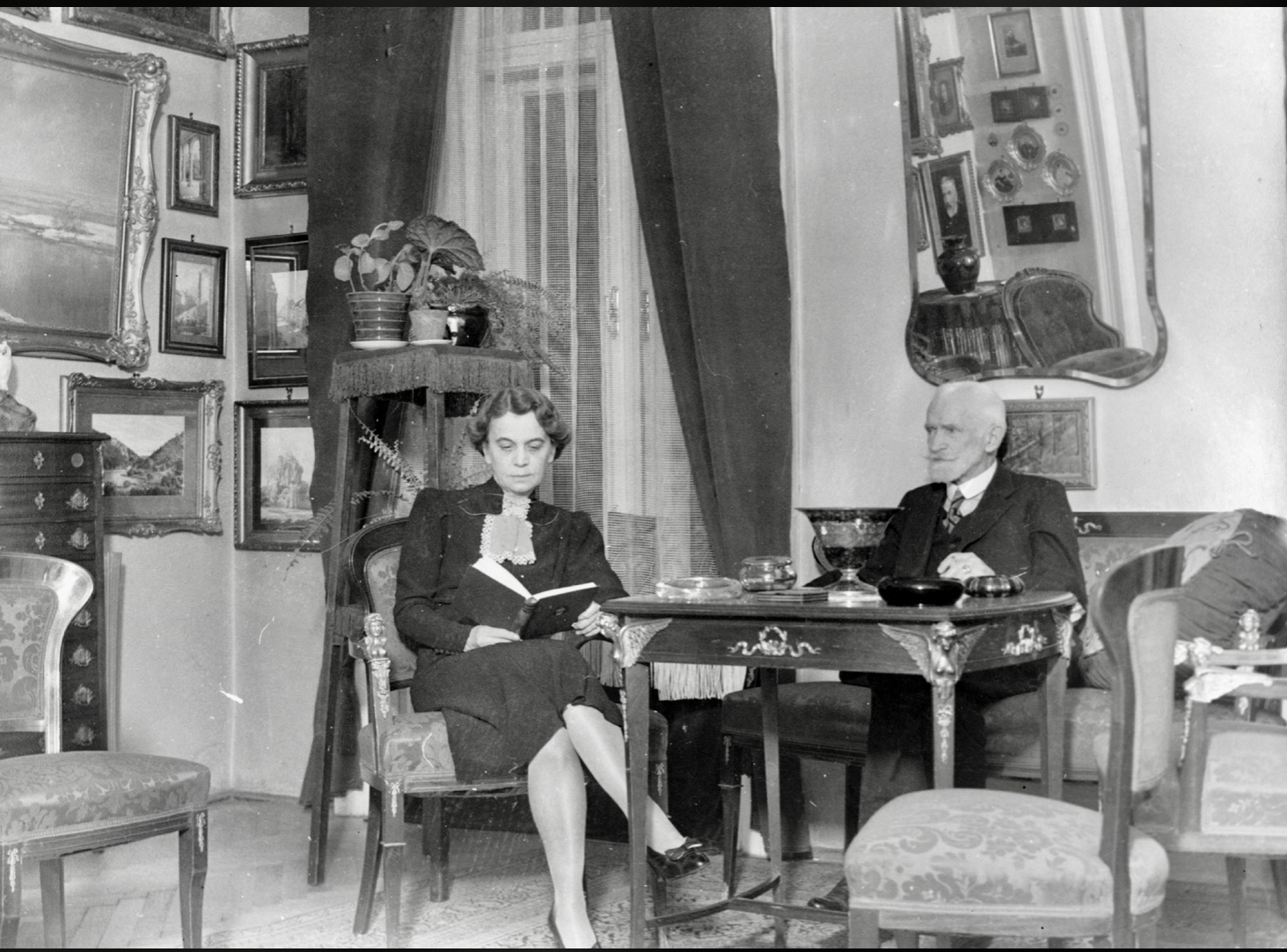
The geographer Jenő Cholnoky with his wife at Gyulai Pál utca 1/II/5, in 1939

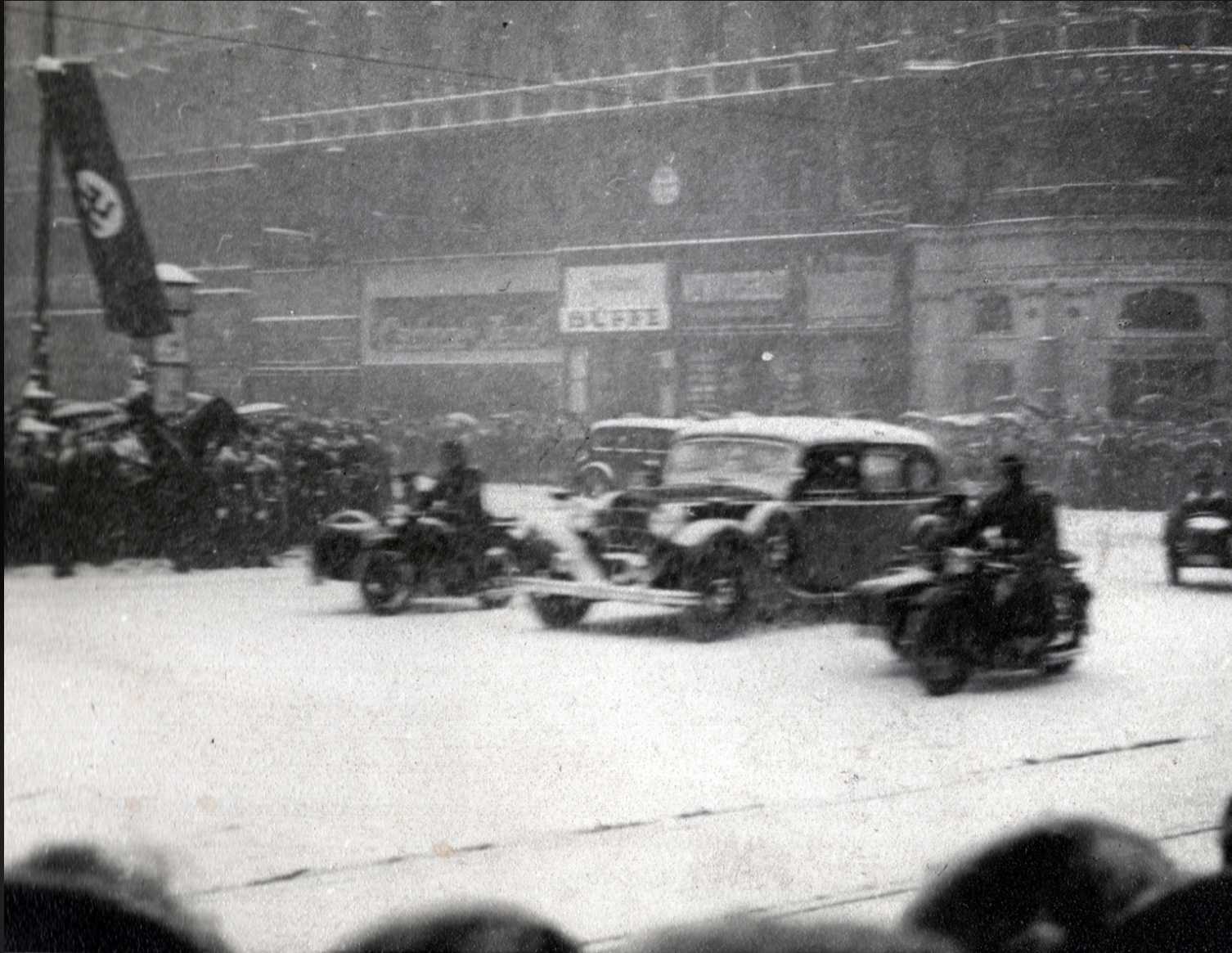
German foreign minister Ribbentrop's car at the intersection of the Erzsébet körút and Rákóczi út, 8 January 1942

== Soviet occupation and Communism ==
Still bullet-marked buildings show that the Palace District, like the rest of Budapest, was left scarred by the fighting at the end of the Second World War. The damage was particularly bad around the Nagykörút and Kálvin tér. But while buildings on the former were reconstructed more or less to their original state, on Kálvin tér many of the fine 19th century buildings on both sides of the square were demolished. More damage in both parts of the Palace District was inflicted during the 1956 uprising and the subsequent Soviet attack.

The communist regime neglected the district's buildings and committed some great acts of vandalism, especially the demolition in 1965 of the city's National Theatre, until 1908 the Népszínház (People's Theatre – or Volkstheater) on Blaha Lujza tér. This building, much loved by Budapesters, had been constructed in 1875 to the designs of Fellner & Helmer. The loss of the National Theatre still seems to leave a gap on Blaha Lujza tér. A street on the eastern side of the József körút which led to the Népszínház is still called Népszínház utca. In 1948 the regime also demolished the National Stables behind the Museum. In 1952, it used part of the area to construct a concrete bunker designed to enable the regime to continue broadcasting in case of emergency including nuclear attack. The interior ministry also used it for conducting wiretaps. In 1969 this was incorporated into a larger Hungarian Radio office block equally unsympathetic to its grand surroundings.

As the post-war communist regime consolidated its grip, the names of a number of streets and institutions in the Palotanegyed were changed. In 1946 Főherceg Sándor utca (Archduke Alexander Street) was renamed Bródy Sándor utca.Sándor Bródy (writer) (1863-1924) was a Jewish-born novelist, dramatist, and short-story writer who was 'among the first in Hungarian literature to focus attention on the urban proletariat, and the first to introduce the coarse and pungent vernacular of the big city into literary works'. In the same year the metropolitan library in the former Wenckheim Palace was named the Szabó Ervin Library in honour of Ervin Szabó, a revolutionary socialist who translated the works of Marx and Engels into Hungarian and who in 1911 had been appointed the library's director. In 1949, Eszterházy utca and Ötpacsirta utca were renamed Puskin utca. Two years later, in 1948, the section of Baross utca in front of the library was renamed Szabó Ervin tér Surprisingly, the communist regime did not rename the József körút (Joseph ringroad), named after the Archduke of Austria and Holy Roman Emperor Joseph II, as it did the Teréz and Erzsébet stretches of the ringroad, also named after Habsburg monarchs. In 1950, Horánszky utca, named after Dual Monarchy-era Hungarian member of parliament and trade minister Nándor Horánszky, was renamed Makarenko utca, in honour of Soviet educational theorist Anton Makarenko. In 1962, Rökk Szillárd utca, named after a wealthy 19th century philanthropist, was renamed Somogyi Béla after a leftist journalist murdered by White forces in 1920.

Of the Palotanegyed's eleven or so cafés which existed during Budapest's pre-war heyday, all except one vanished. The one survival, the Múzeum, closed during the Covid period and as at February 2026 has not reopened, though there are reports it will.

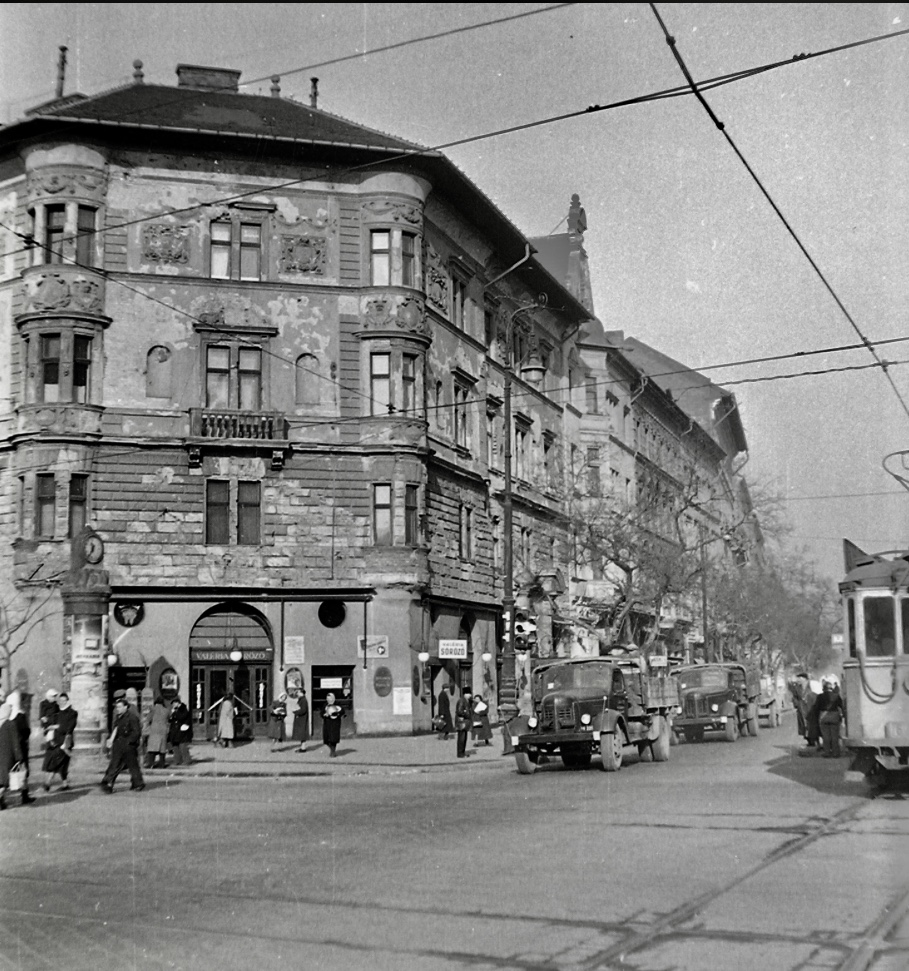
Corner of Üllői út and József körút, 1950

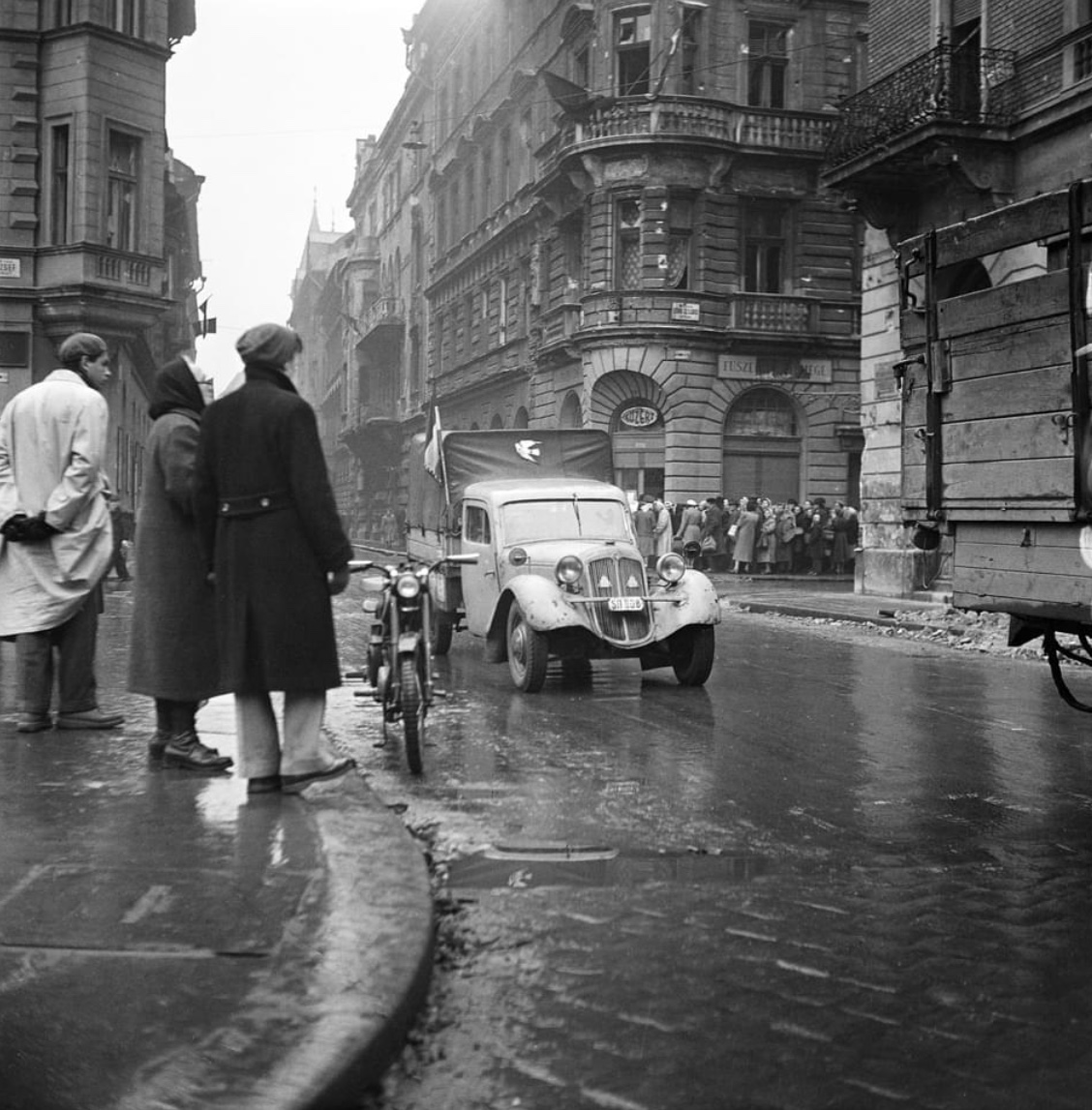
Közért grocery store on the corner of Krúdy utca and Rökk Szilárd utca, 1956. Now a G Roby supermarket.

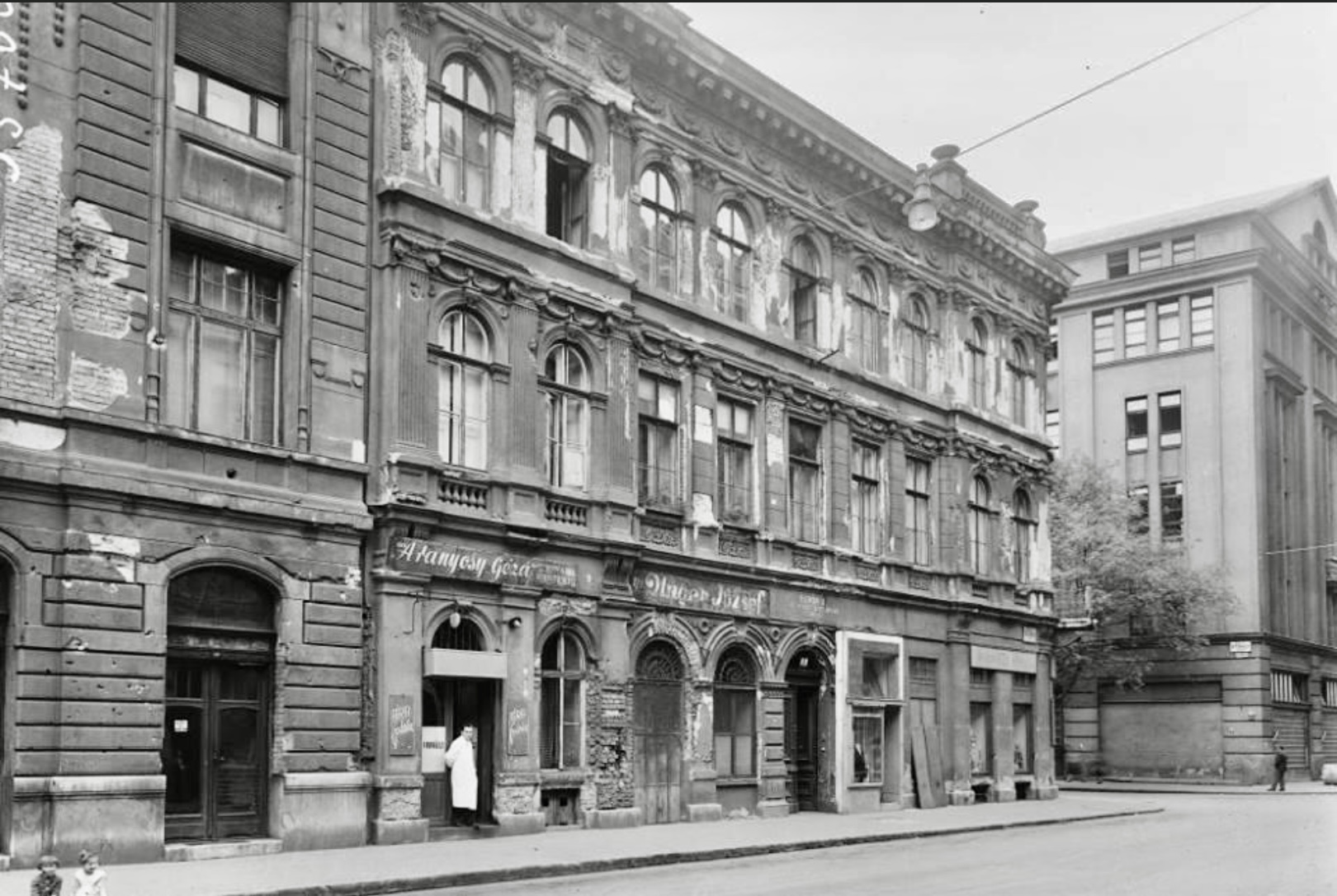
Somogyi Béla utca 5 in 1957. At right is the Corvin Áruház.

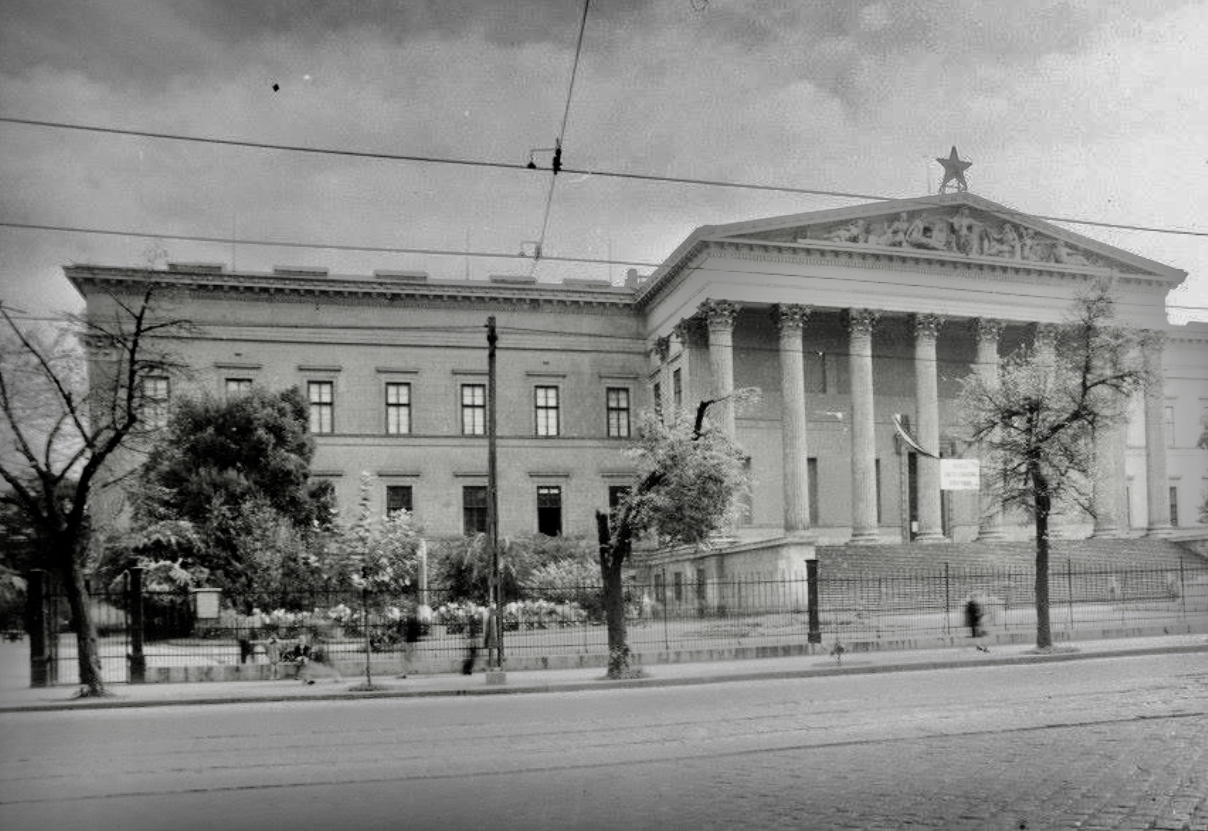
The National Museum, 1959

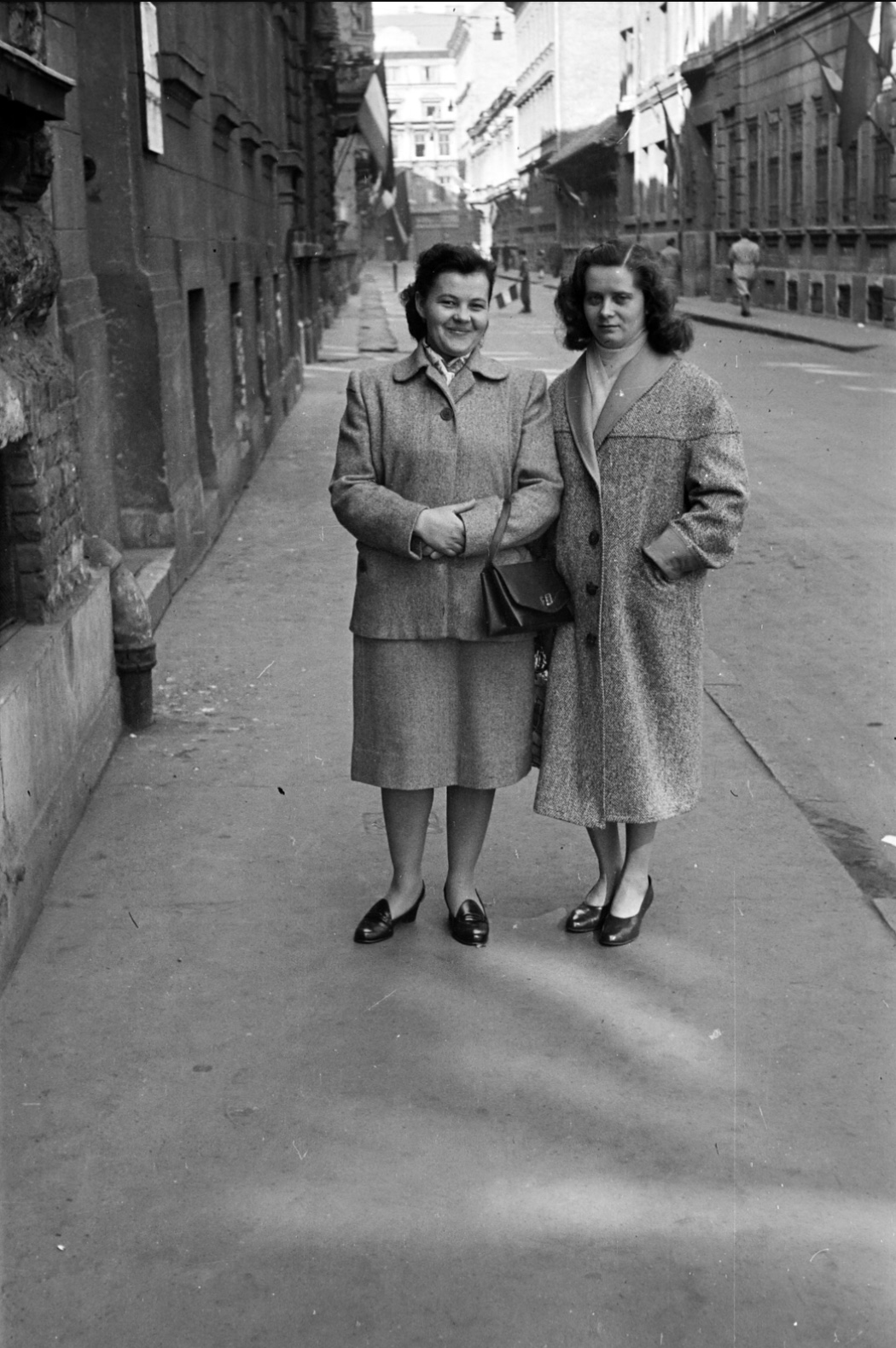
Makarenko (Horánszky utca) 19, 1959

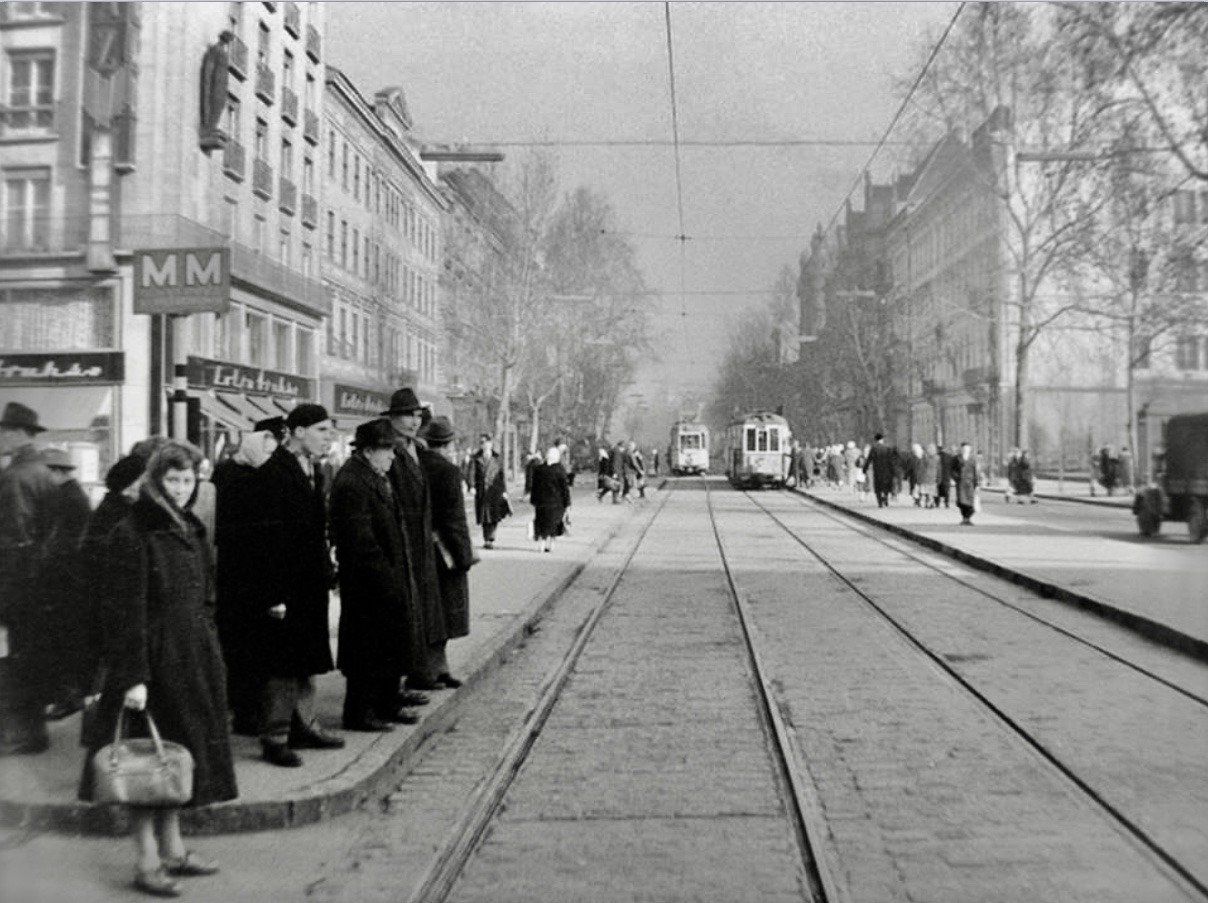
Rákóczi út from the Múzeum körút intersection looking eastwards, 1960

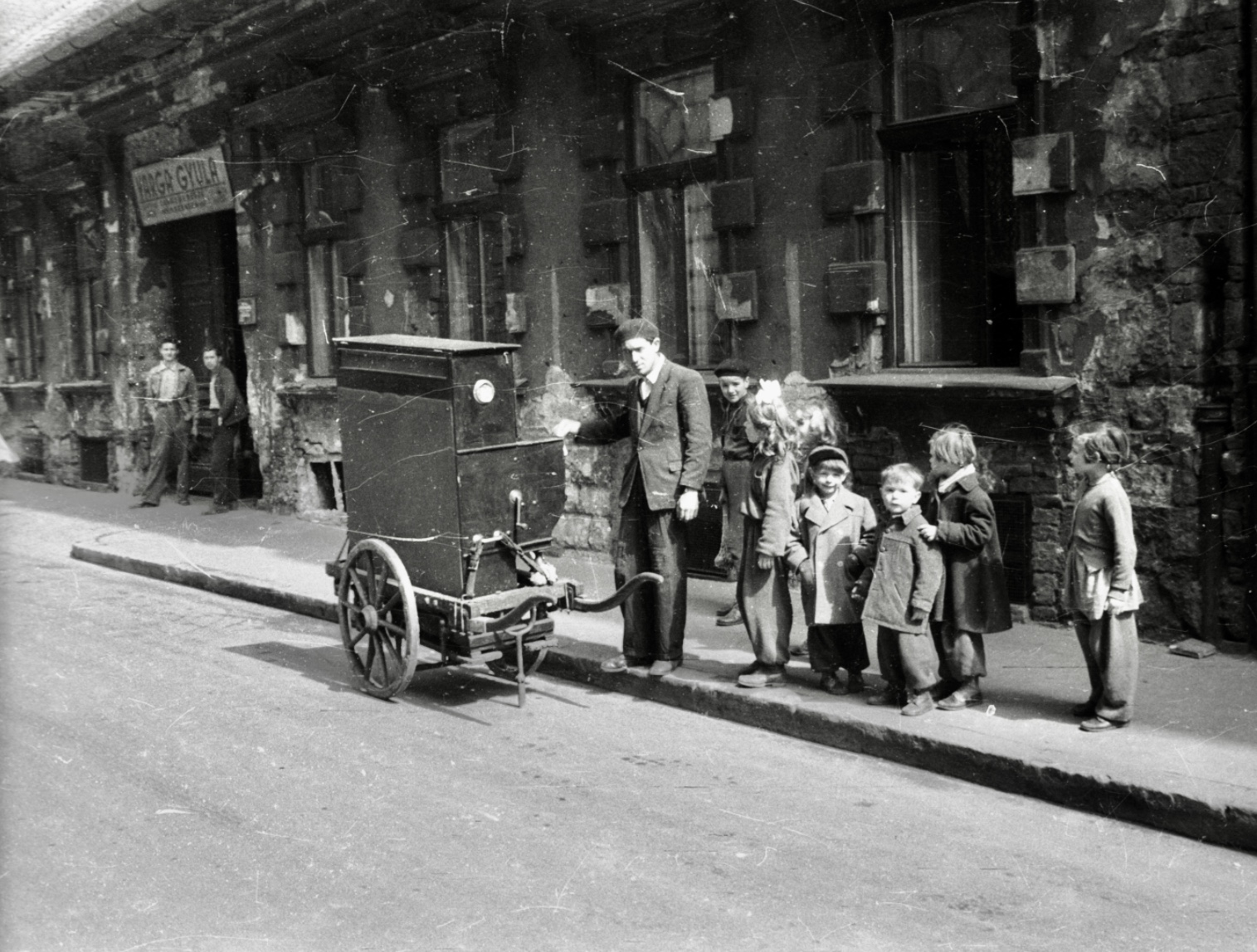
Makarenko (Horánszky) utca 10 in 1960, a later-demolished building replaced by one which now houses a tapas bar

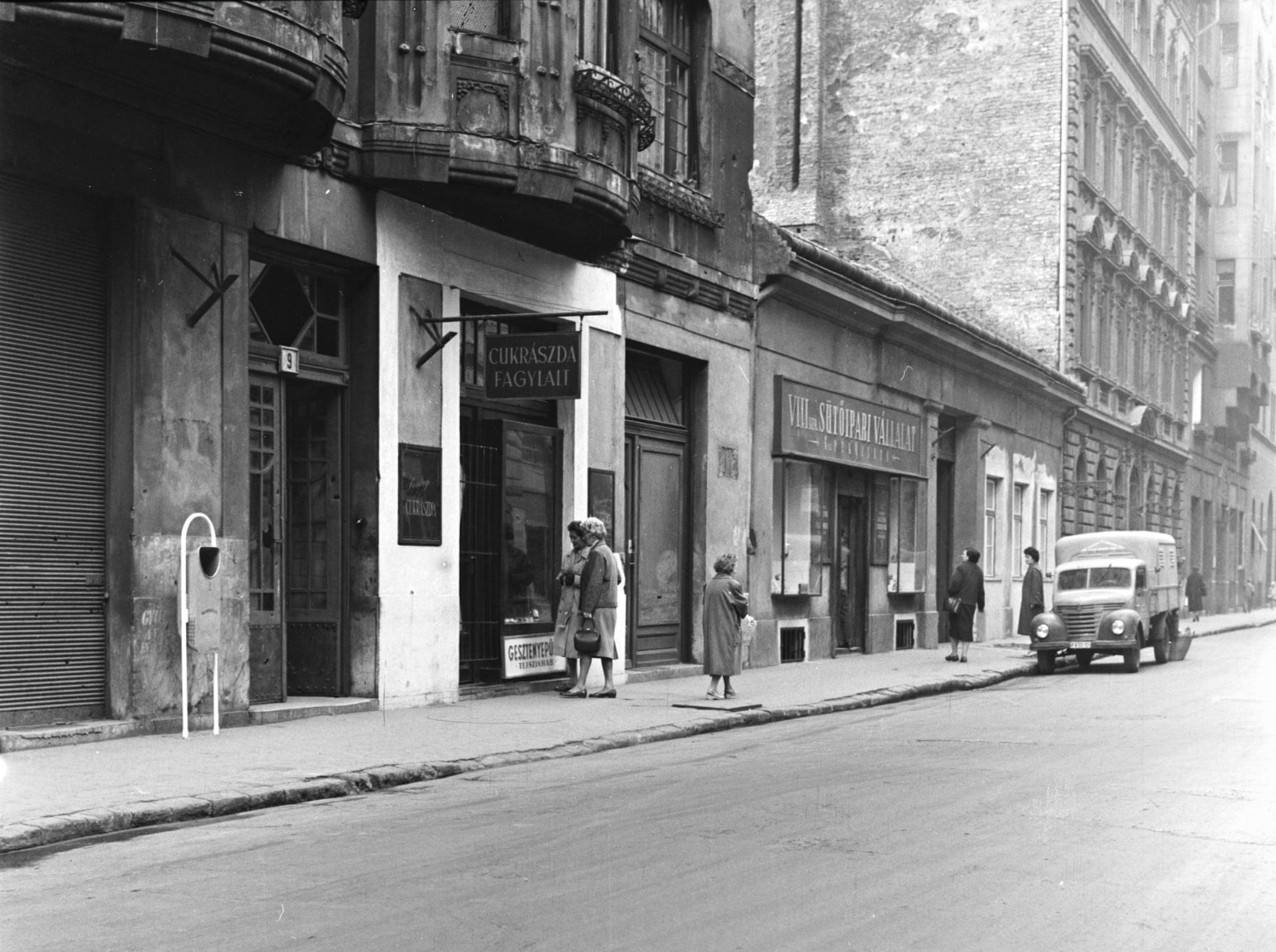
Krúdy utca in 1961, showing what was later the Dárshán udvar, then a bakery

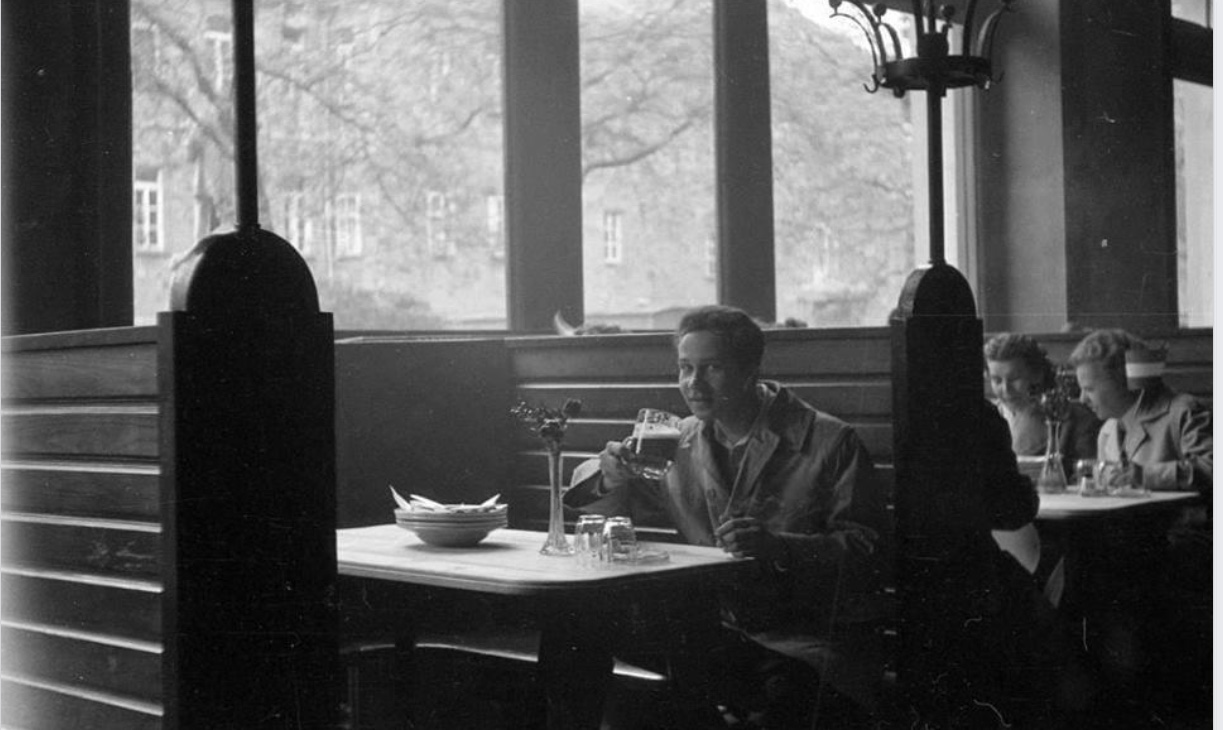
The Bástya Söröző, corner of Gyulai Pál utca and Rákóczi út, 1960

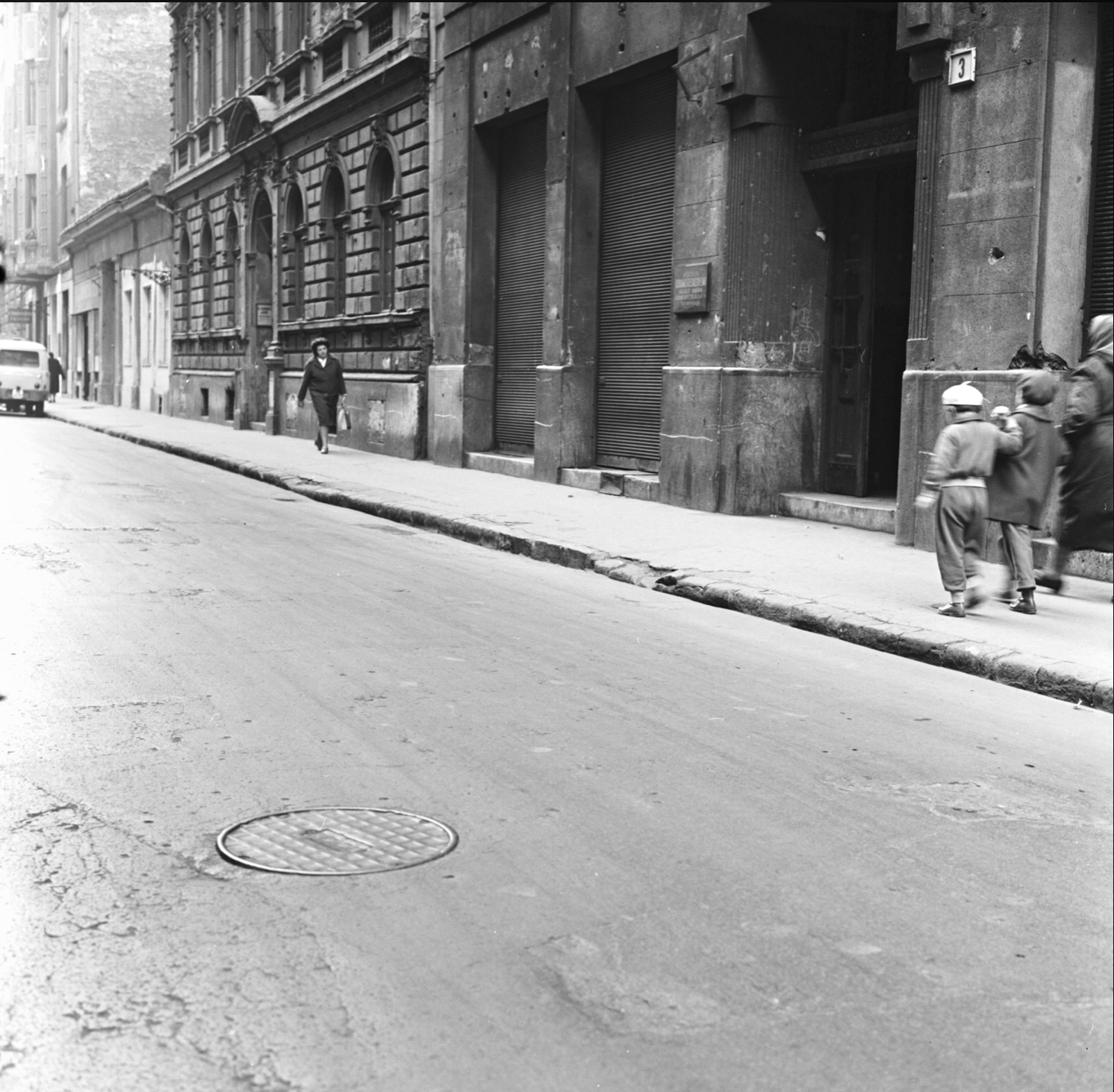
Krúdy utca, looking towards the Nagykörút, in 1961

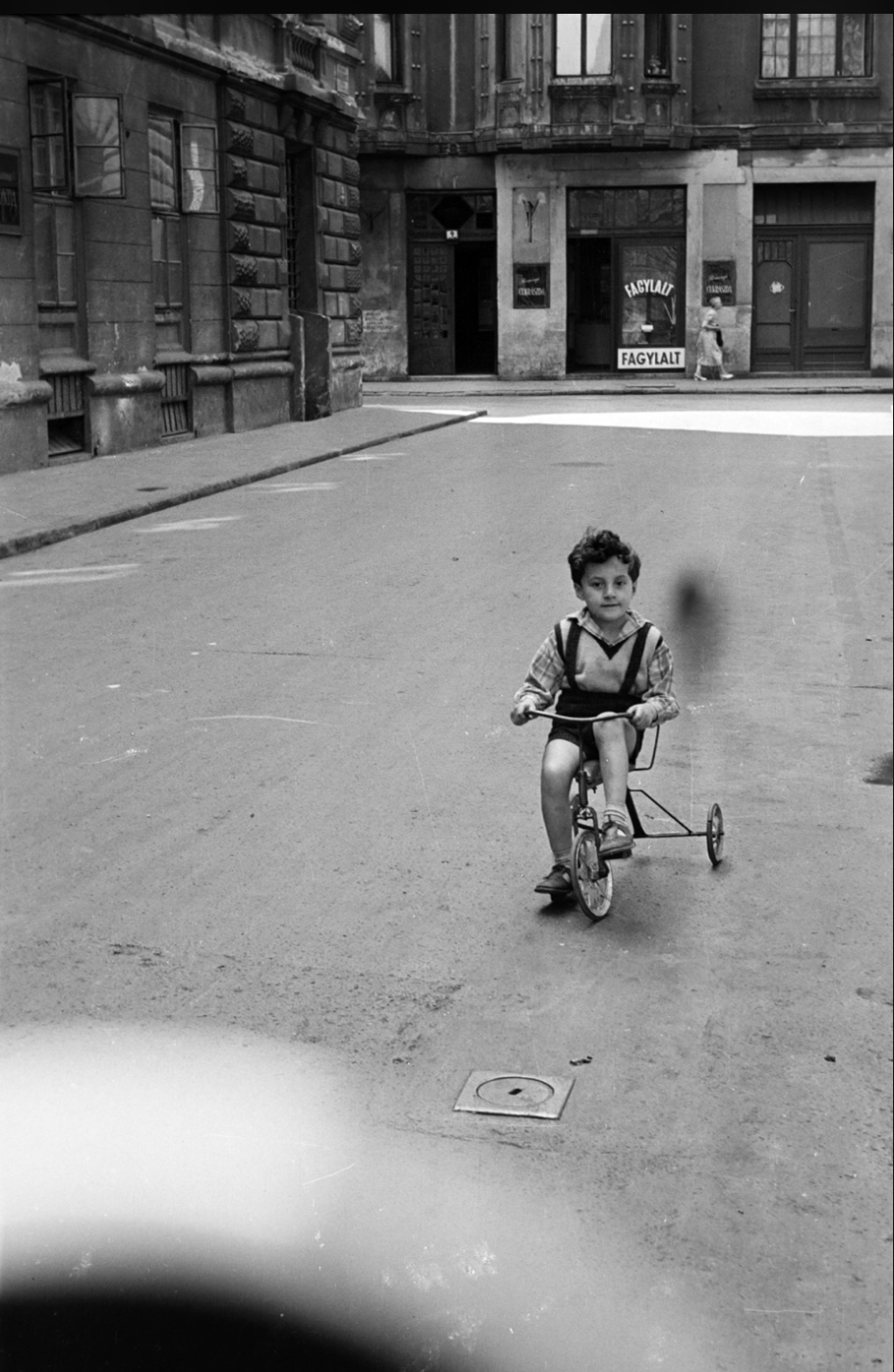
Corner of Horánszky (then Makarenko) and Krúdy streets 1962

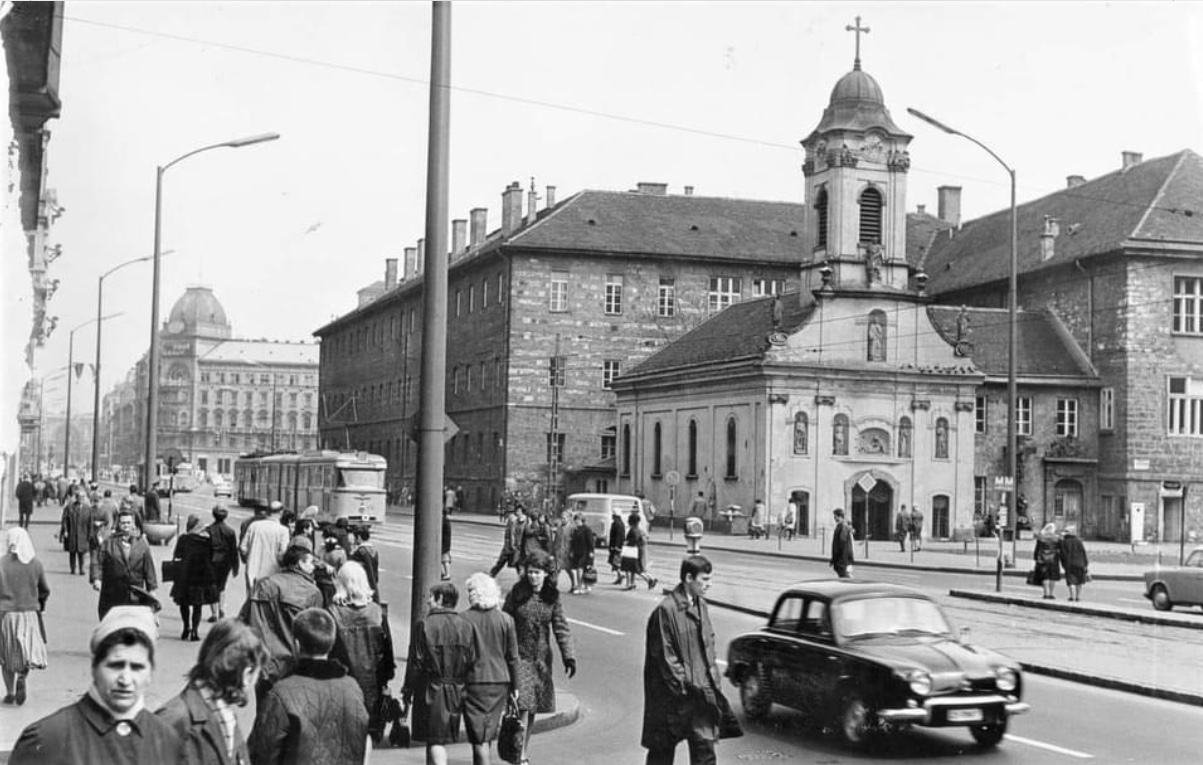
Rákóczi út, 1960s

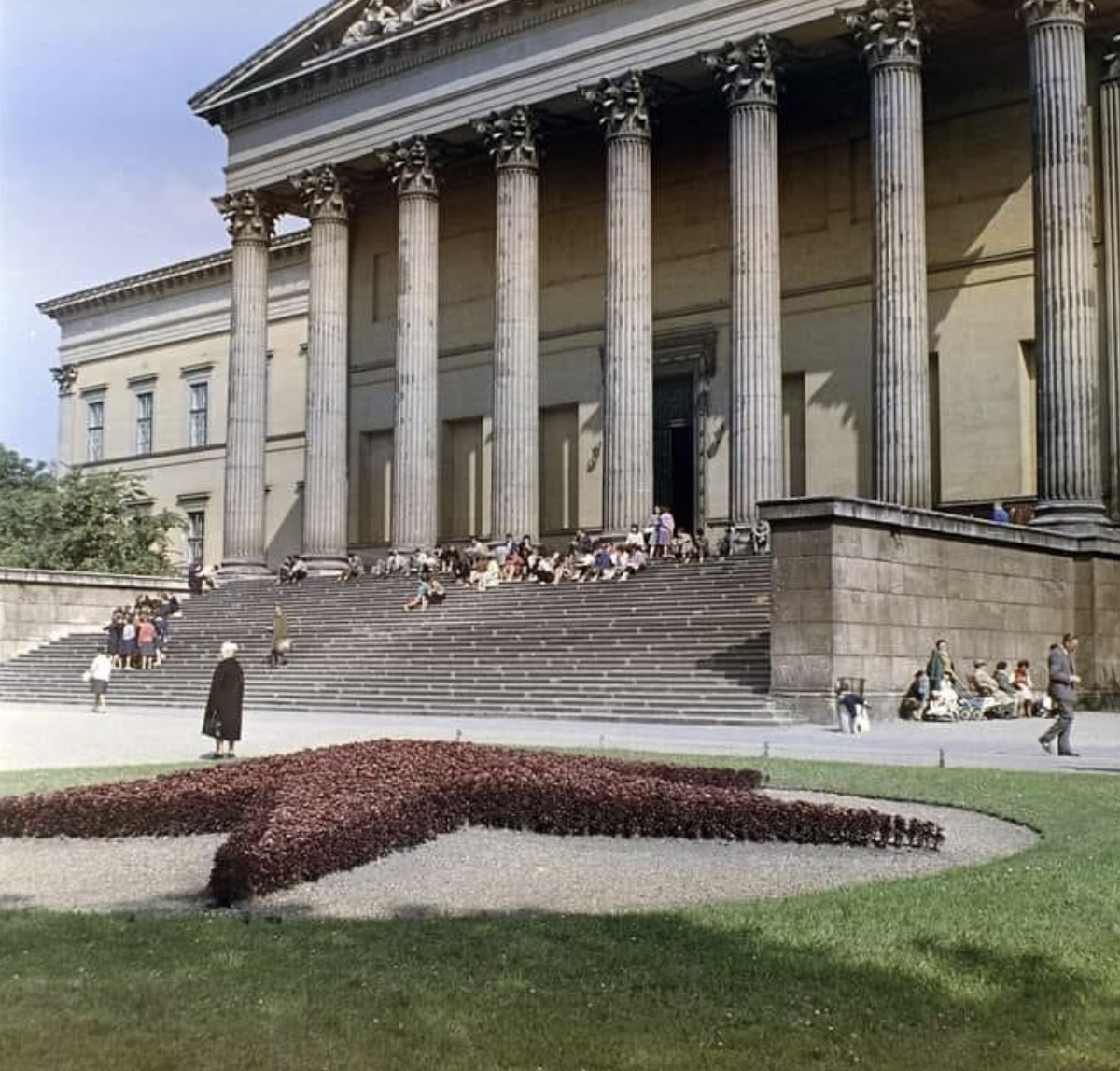
National Museum 1962 (Főfotó Fortepan)

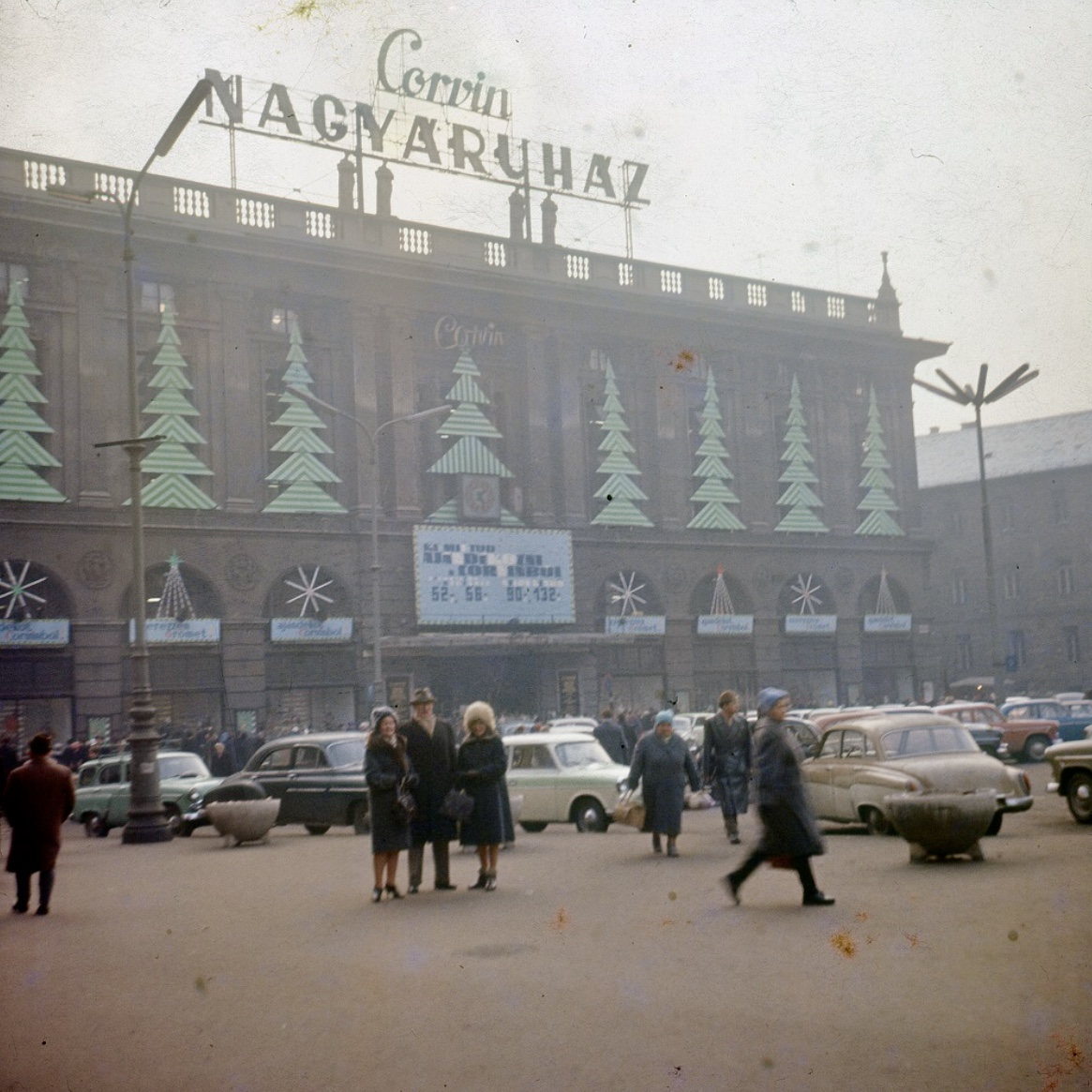
Corvin Nagyáruház, December 1963. The group of three towards the centre are, from right, Jean Higgie (the mother of the author of this Wikipedia page), Freddy Ordish, then-Chief Migration Officer, Australian Legation Vienna, and his wife Peggy.

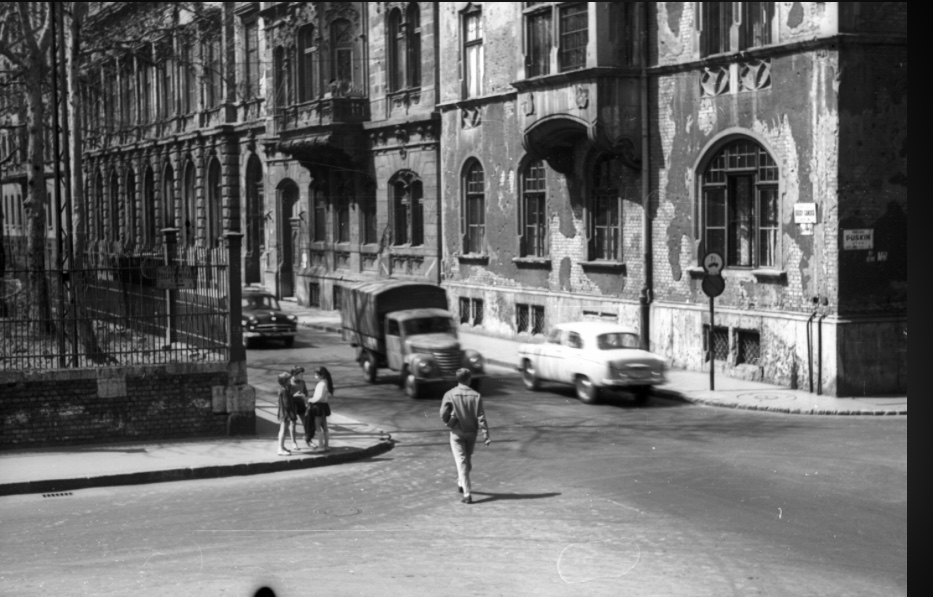
The Gschwindt Pace in 1964

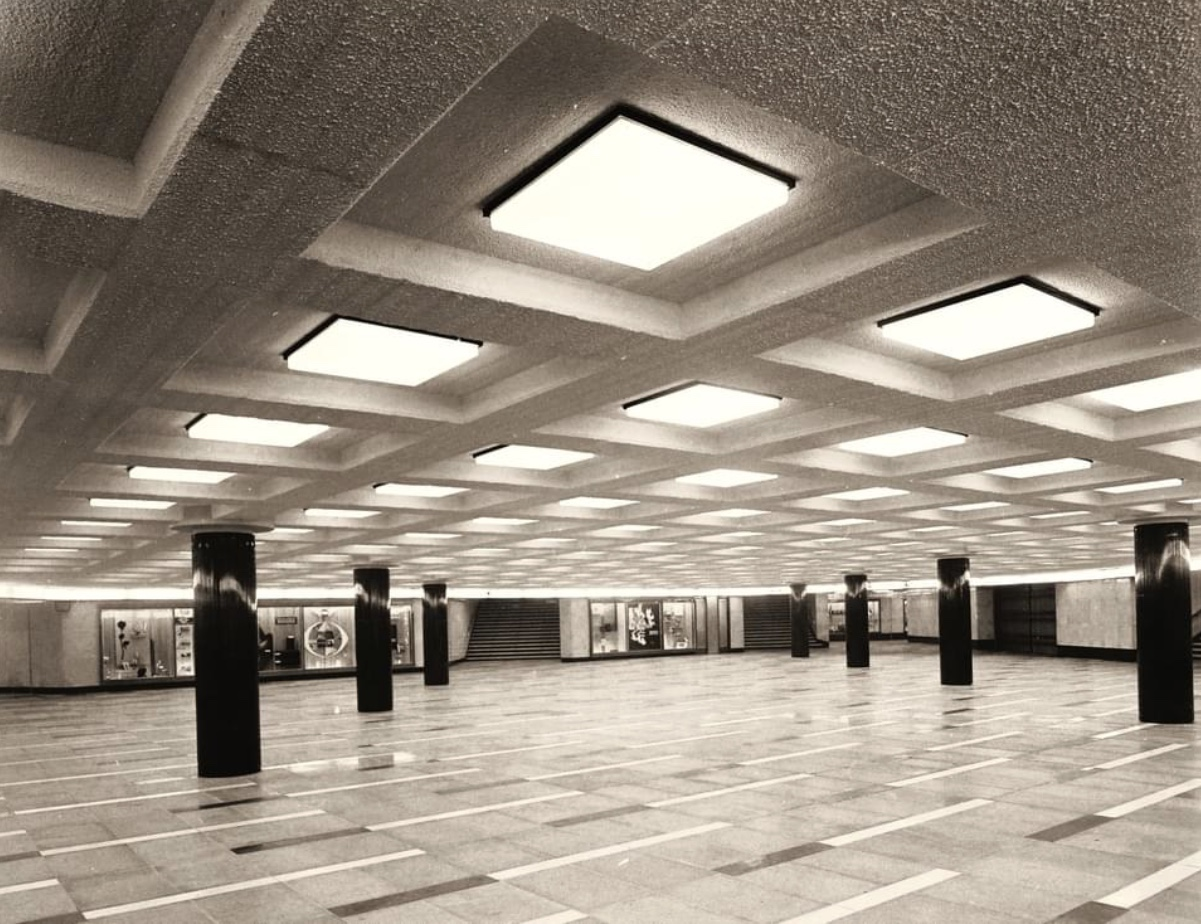
The new Blaha Lujza tér underpass, 1966

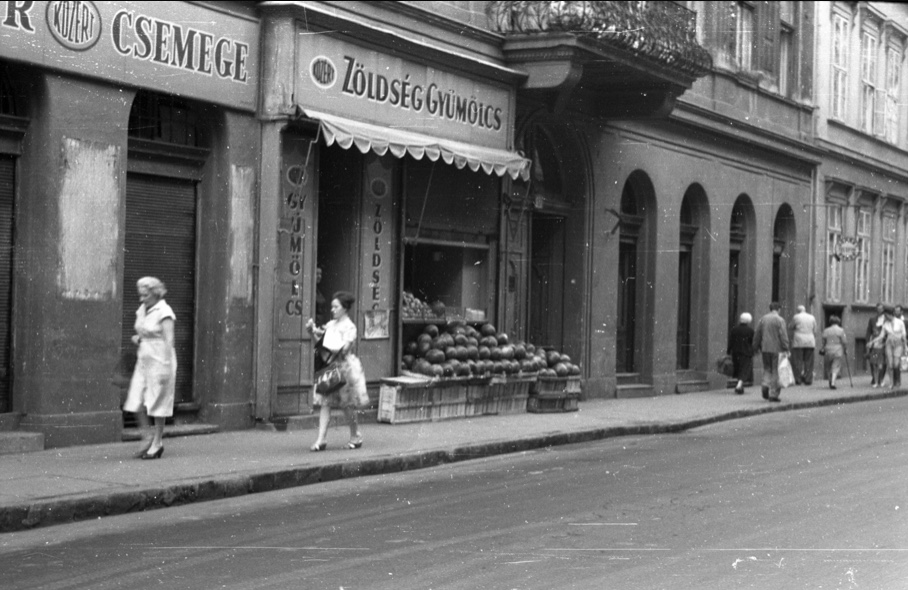
Bródy Sándor utca 17 in 1966

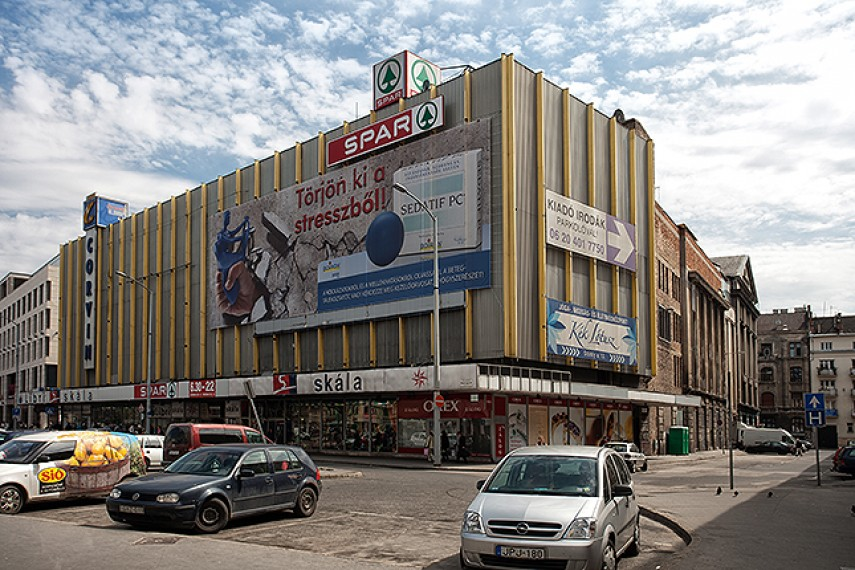
The Corvin Áruház (department store) (1926), after it was clad in aluminium in 1967

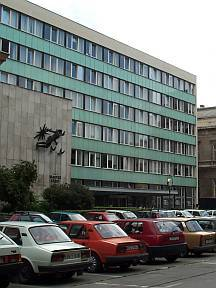
The 1969 building which replaced the National Stables, one of the Palotanegyed's mercifully few relics of the communist era – and slated for demolition

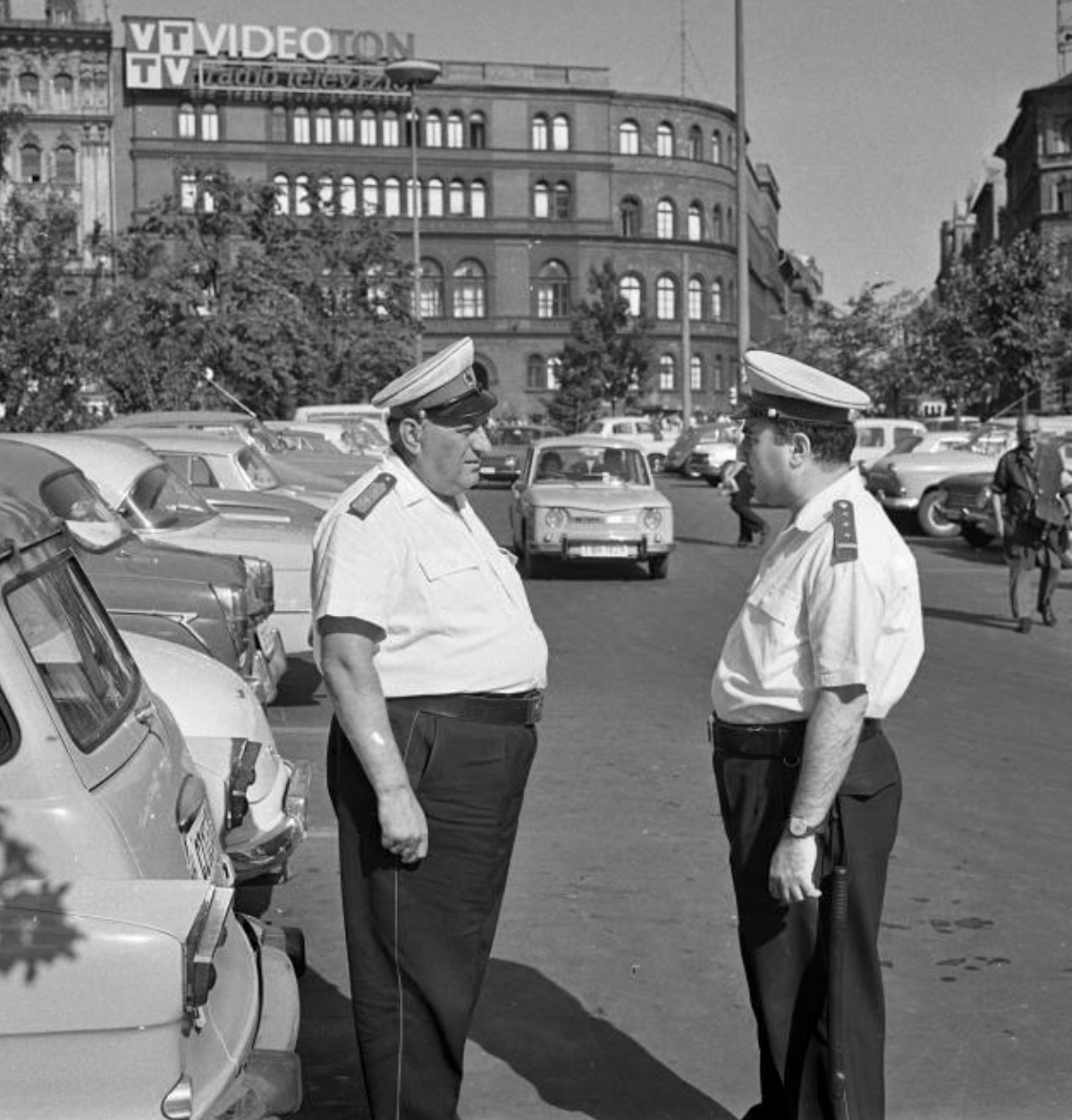
Policemen on Blaha Lujza tér, 1969

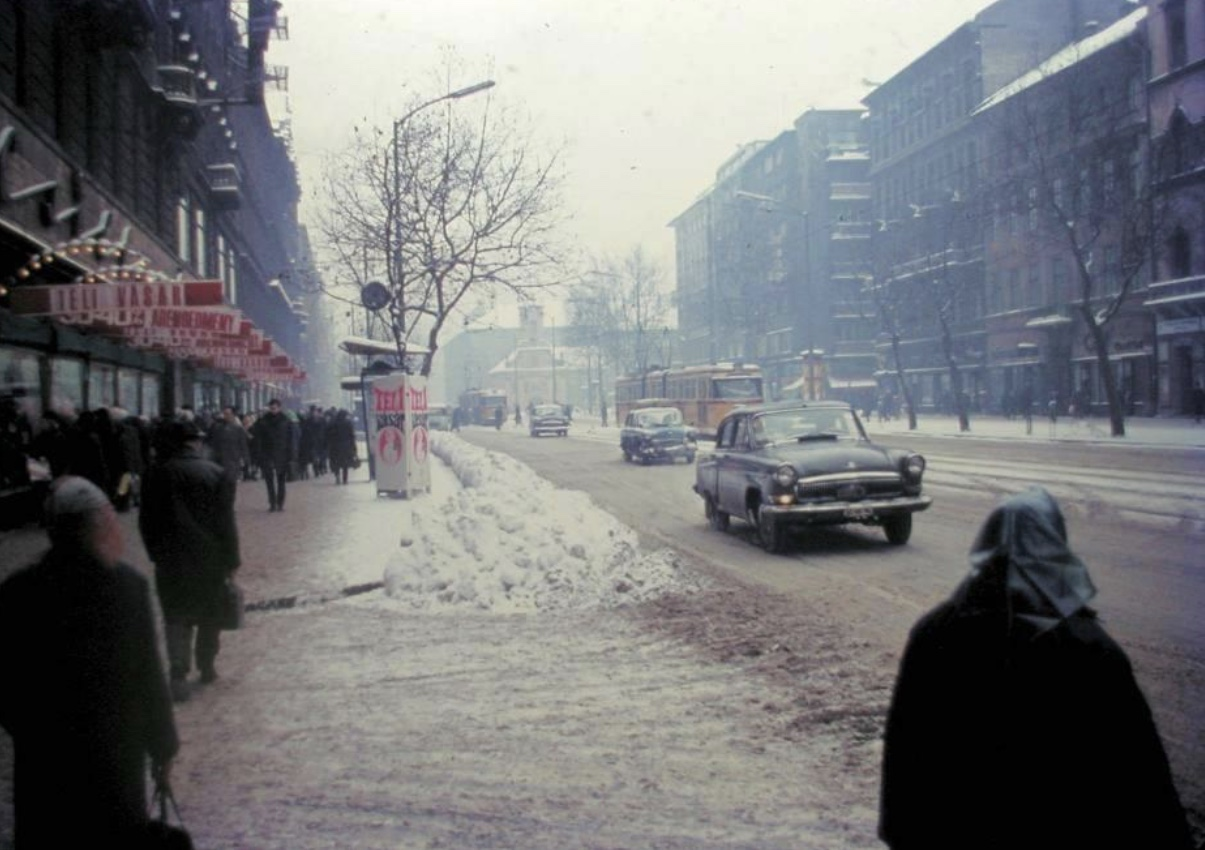
Rákóczi út corner with Kazinczy utca looking towards the Szent Rókus chapel, 1970

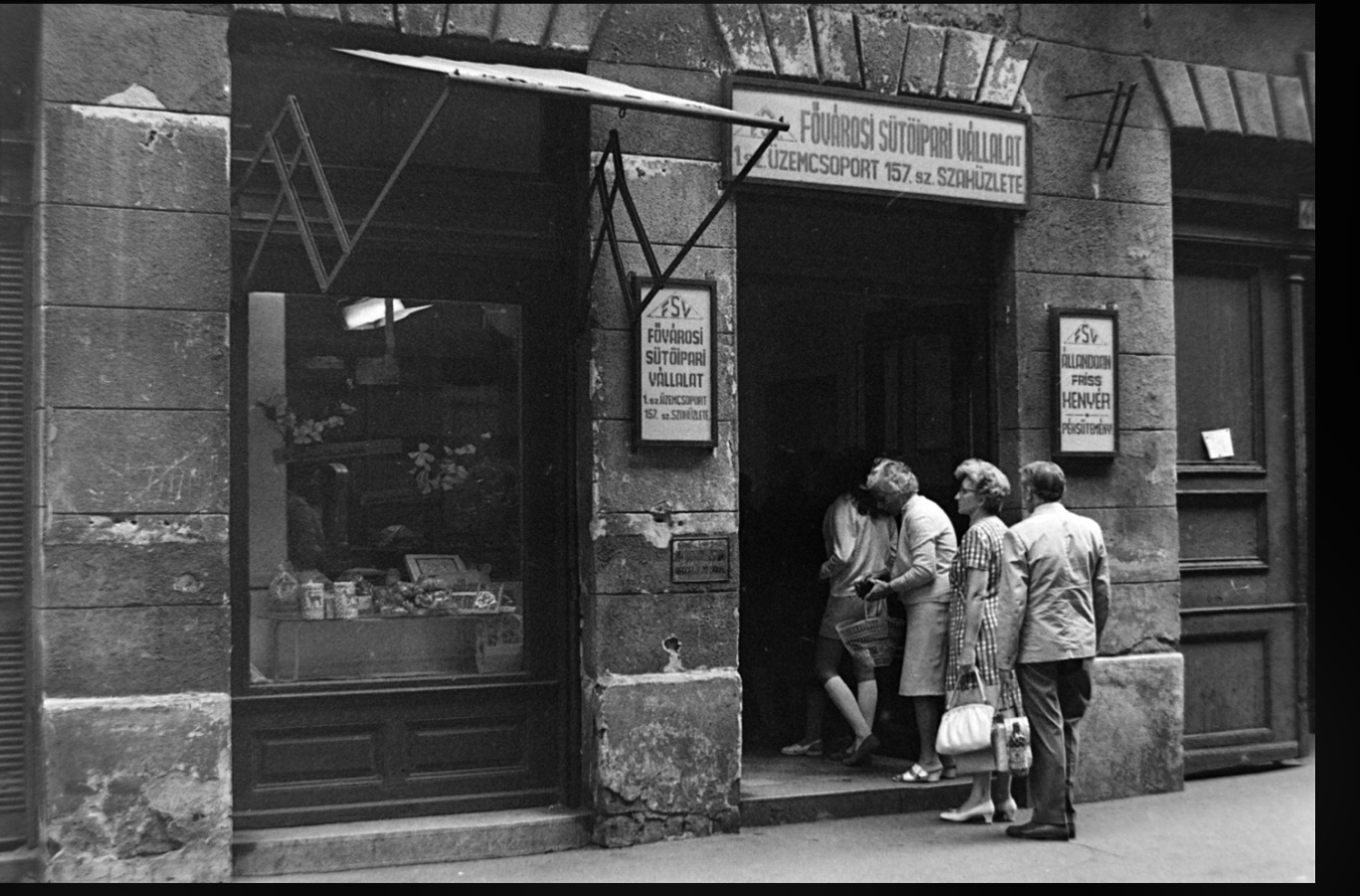
Bakery, Bródy Sándor utca 40, 1970

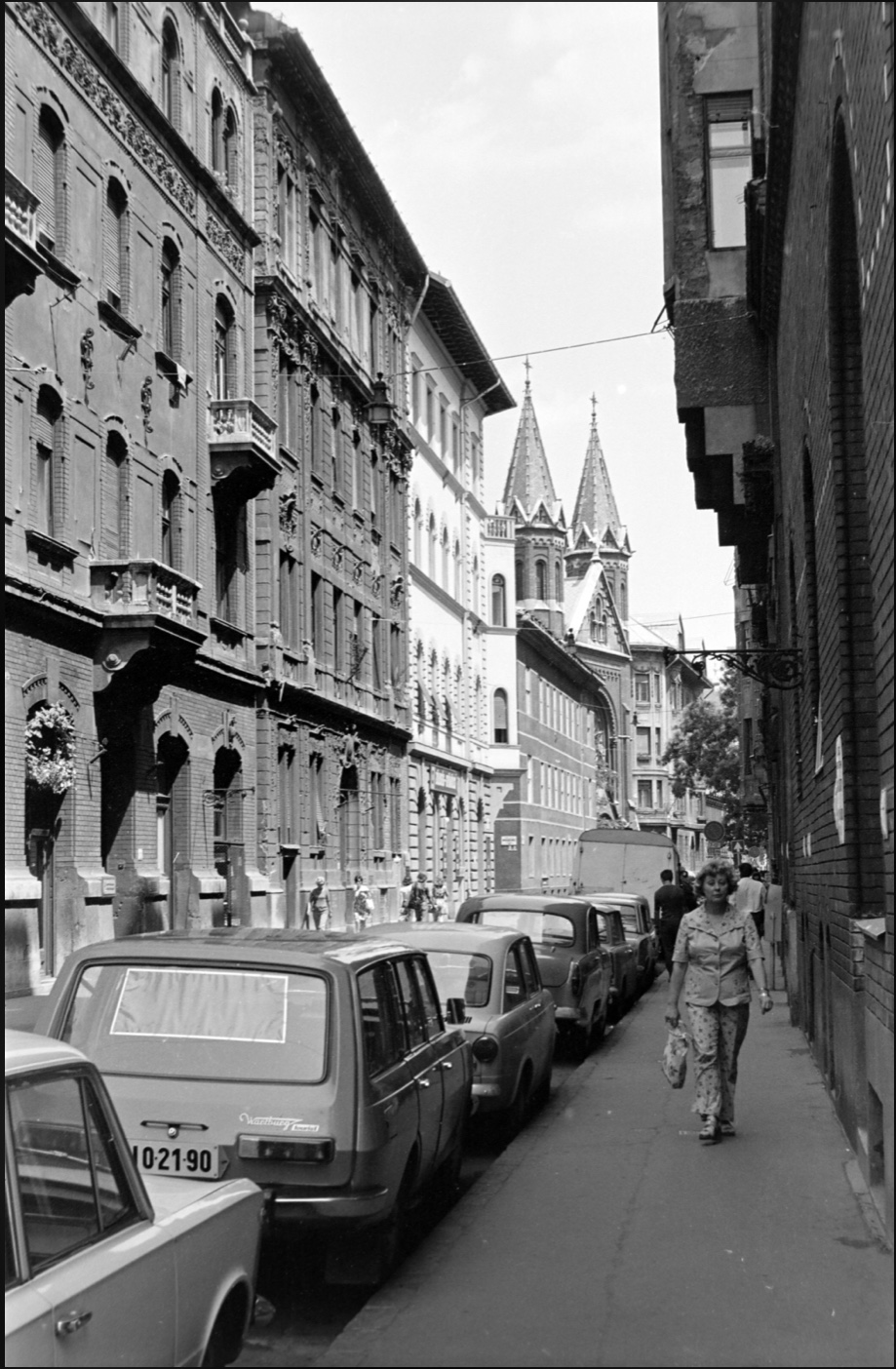
Krúdy utca 1978

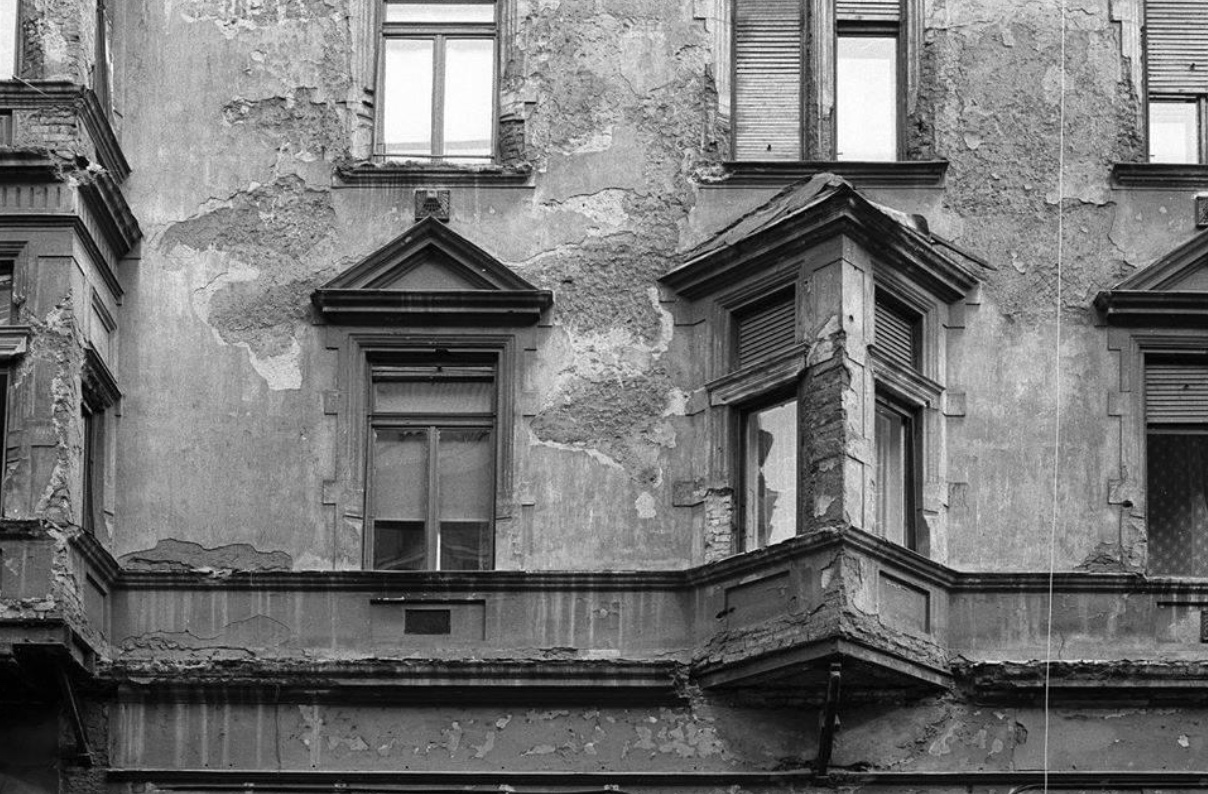
Somogyi Béla utca 16, 1985

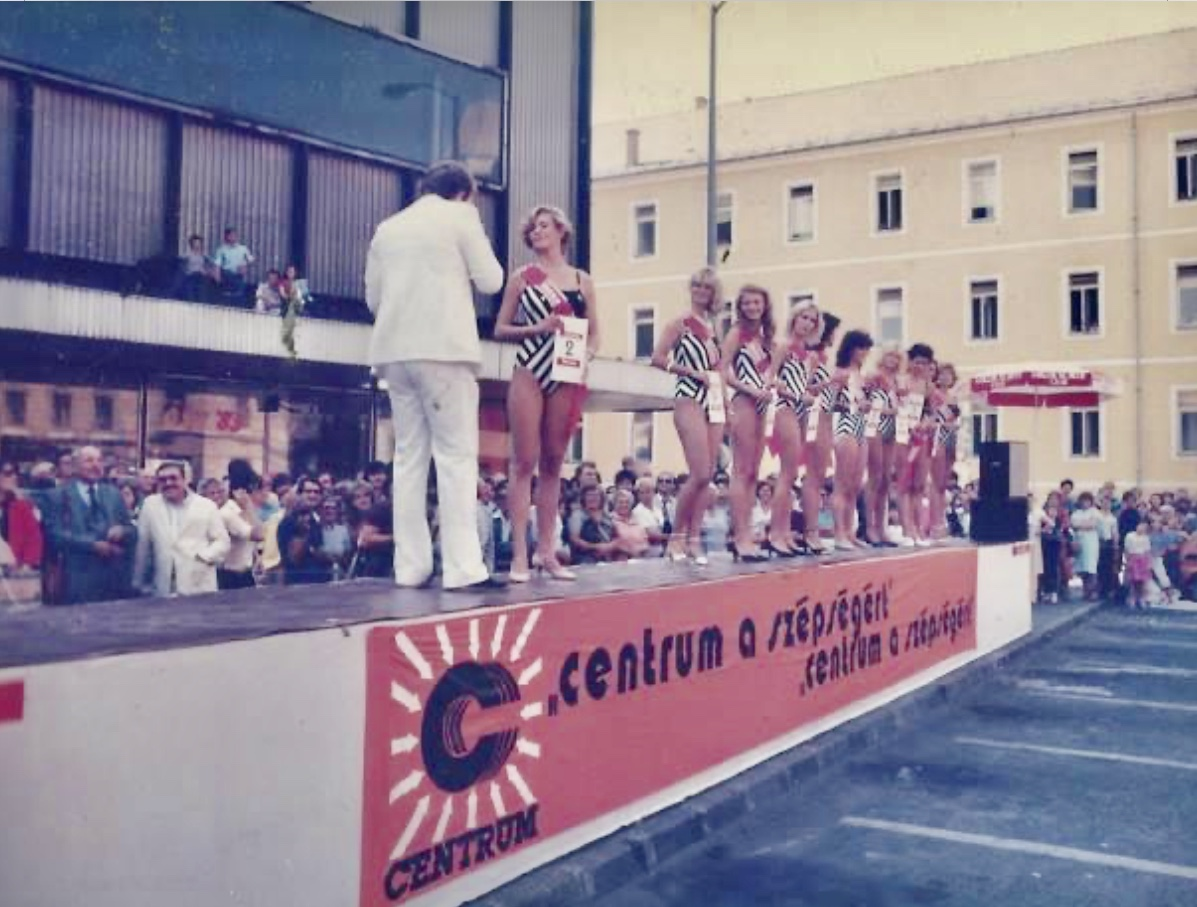
Beauty contest at the Corvin Áruház, 1985

== Since 1989 ==
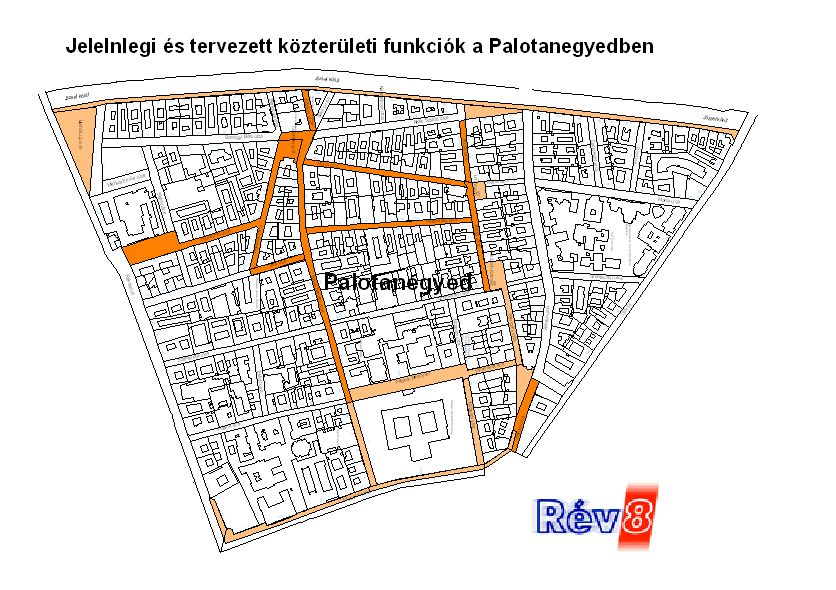
Palotanegyed map (2009) showing existing and planned road/footpath reconstruction

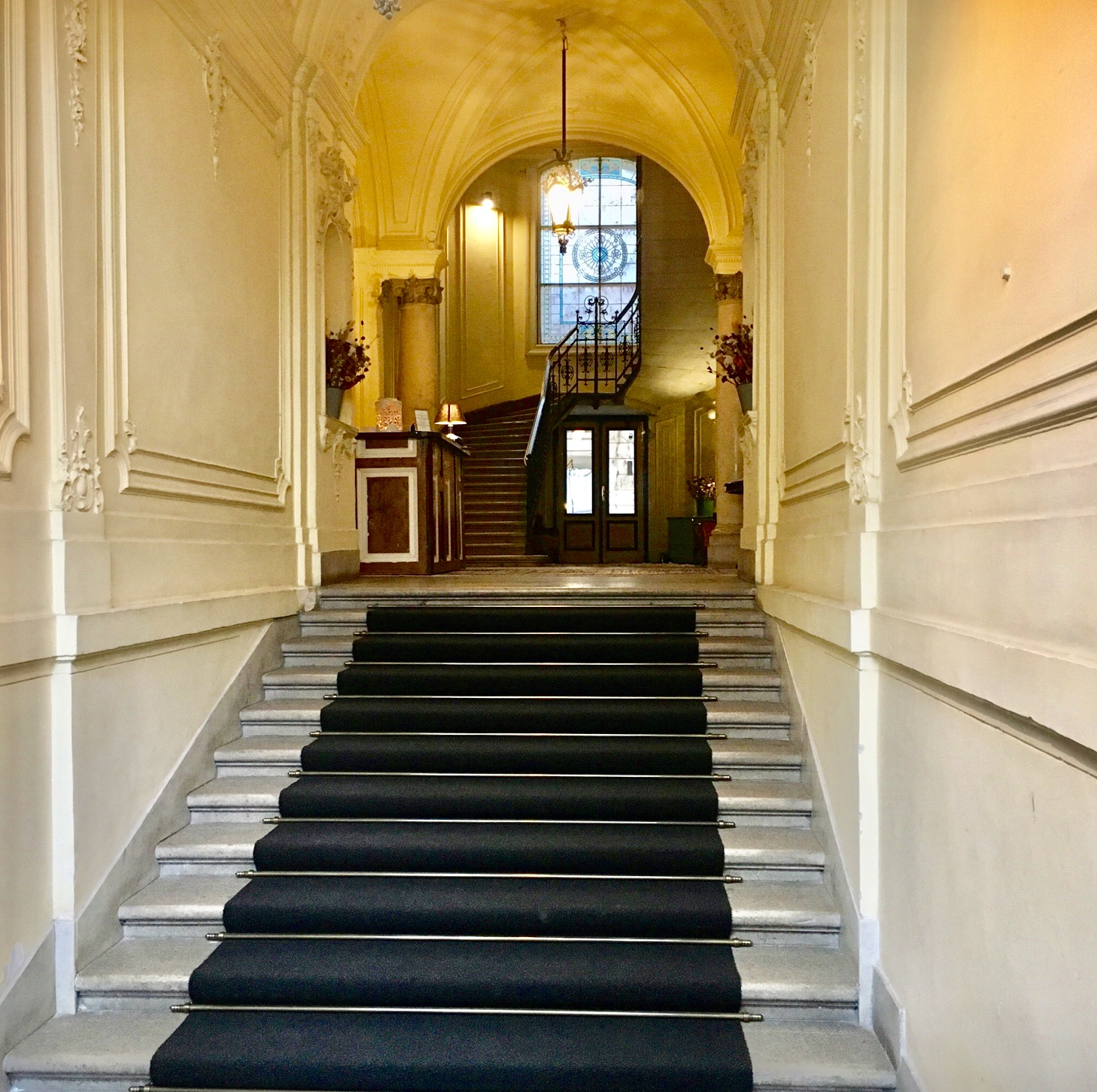
The elegant entrance of Bródy House, in the Tauffer Palace, Bródy Sándor u. 10

Despite the occasional acts of disdain and vandalism shown by the communist regime towards Budapest's historical fabric, the vast majority of the Palotanegyed's pre-World War II buildings survived war, revolution, Soviet occupation and the socialist decades. At the same time, by the early post-communist period, the Józsefváros had acquired a reputation amongst Hungarians as the poorest and most crime-ridden of the Pest districts. This reputation reflected the dilapidation and poverty especially of the outer part of the district (i.e. east of the Józsefkörút) and the proportionately high population of typically poor gypsies in that area. This reputation coloured perceptions of the whole of Józsefváros, including, probably unfairly, the Palotanegyed. It was ironic given that historically the area had been one of the wealthiest parts of the city.

One of the early decisions of the post-1989 democratic authorities was to restore some pre-communist street names. Horánszky utca and Ötpacsirta utca reappeared as did Rökk Szillárd, although, oddly, only at its southern end. Bródy Sándor utca, Puskin utca, Somogyi Béla (at its northern end) and Szabó Ervin tér remained unchanged. The 1930 statue of Count Nandor Zichy in front of what was his palace on Lőrinc pap tér returned.

Since the mid-1990s, the Palotanegyed's fortunes have steadily recovered. Many of the district's palaces have been restored, and slowly other buildings have followed suit. Local and international investors have seen that the area combines charm and inner-city convenience. And the Józsefváros local government has made much progress rebuilding the district's streets to make pedestrian-only areas, widen footpaths, rationalise parking, plant more trees and generally smarten the area up. The mainly pedestrian area from Cálvin tér, through Mikszáth Kálmán tér, Krúdy utca and Lőrinc pap tér now thrives with restaurants and cafes. On the other hand the current left-wing Pikó Józsefváros administration has been weaker than other Budapest local governments in relation to anti-graffiti policies. Graffiti vandalism in the district and a failure by authorities to ensure its removal has become more evident in recent years.

Promising news for the district came with Budapest mayor Karácsony's announcement in early 2021 of his development plans for the city over the next seven years. These include long-overdue improvements to Rákóczi út and Üllői út, both bordering one side in the Palace District. Despite being lined with magnificent buildings, both have become unlovely major roads, difficult for pedestrians to cross and with long stretches treeless. While the plan is currently short on detail, the stated aim will be to reduce road traffic, to give preference to public transport, to provide wider pedestrian areas and better provision for cycling and to plant more trees.

The long empty and neglected turn of the 20th century former Hungarian Association of Civil Servants building at Puskin utca 4 and the neighbouring beer hall and garden at Puskin utca 6 are currently undergoing restoration and redevelopment.

== The Palotanegyed Palaces ==
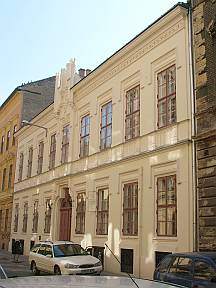
The Kauser House (Gerster Károly, 1860), Gyulai Pál utca 5. Built for János Kauser, a stonemason and sculptor.

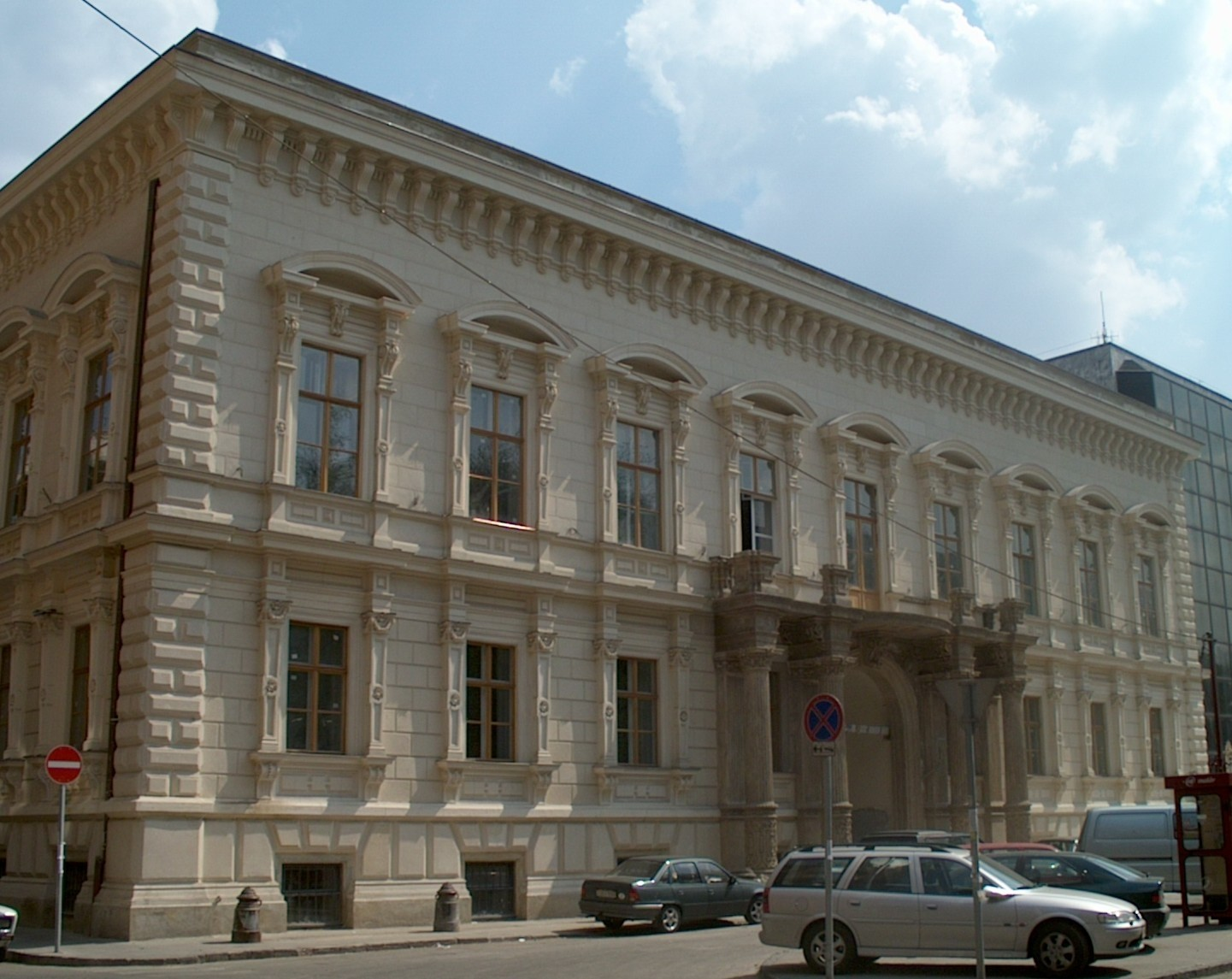
The Festetics Palace (Miklós Ybl, 1862), Pollack Mihály tér 3. Today the Andrássy Gyula Budapest German-language University.

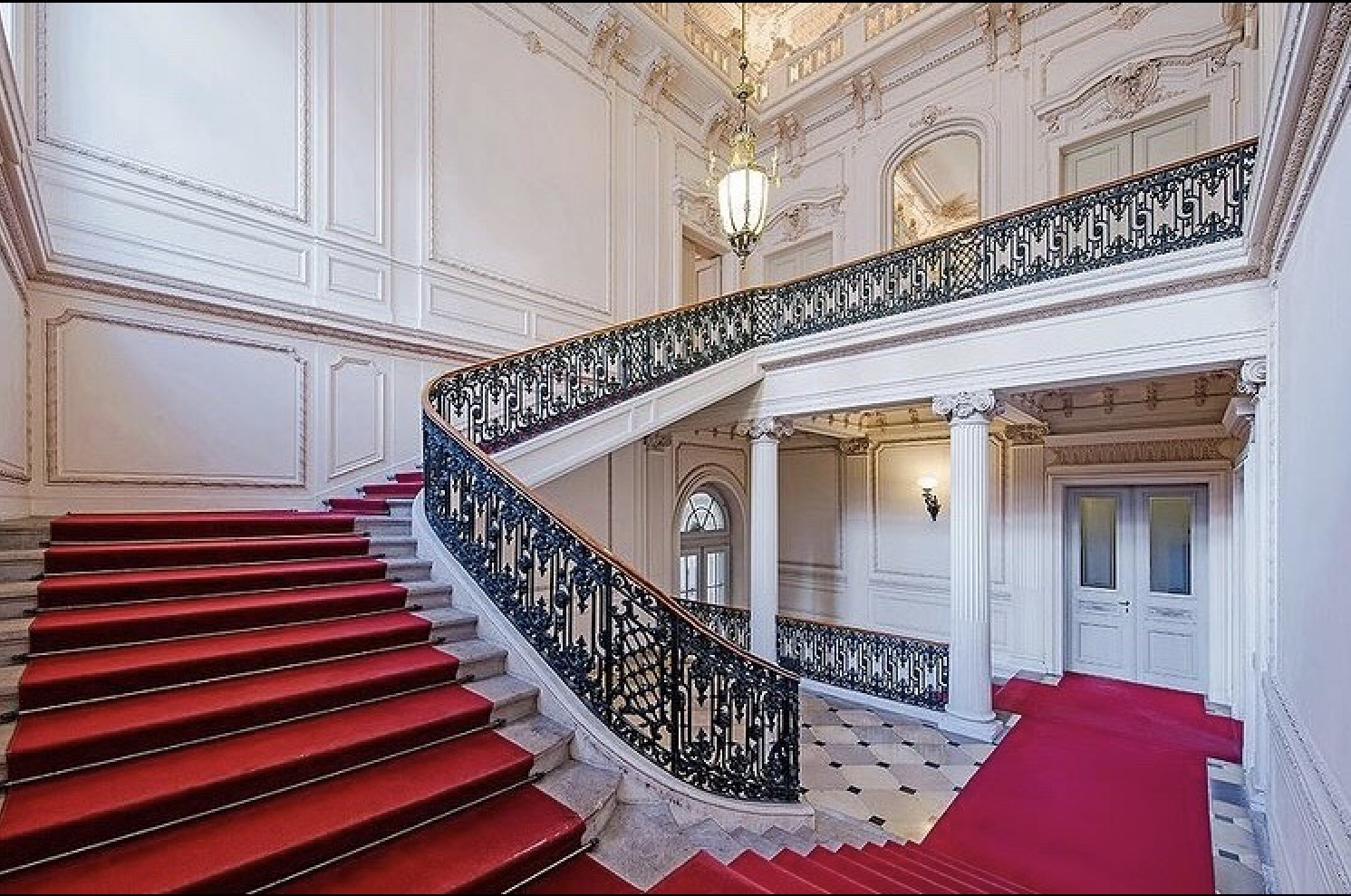
Festetics Palace staircase (Photo: Krisztián Bódis)

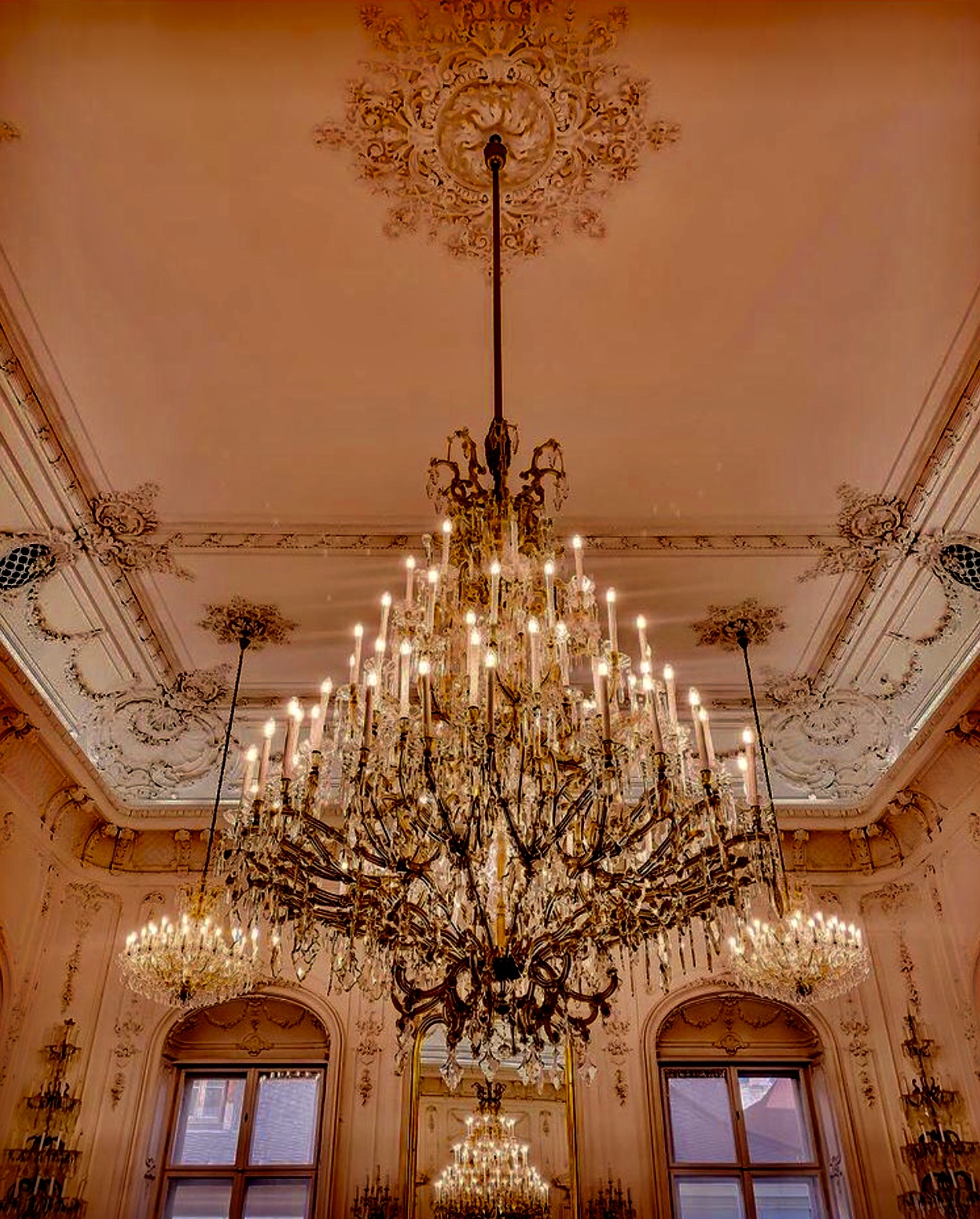
Festetics Place – a spectacular chandelier

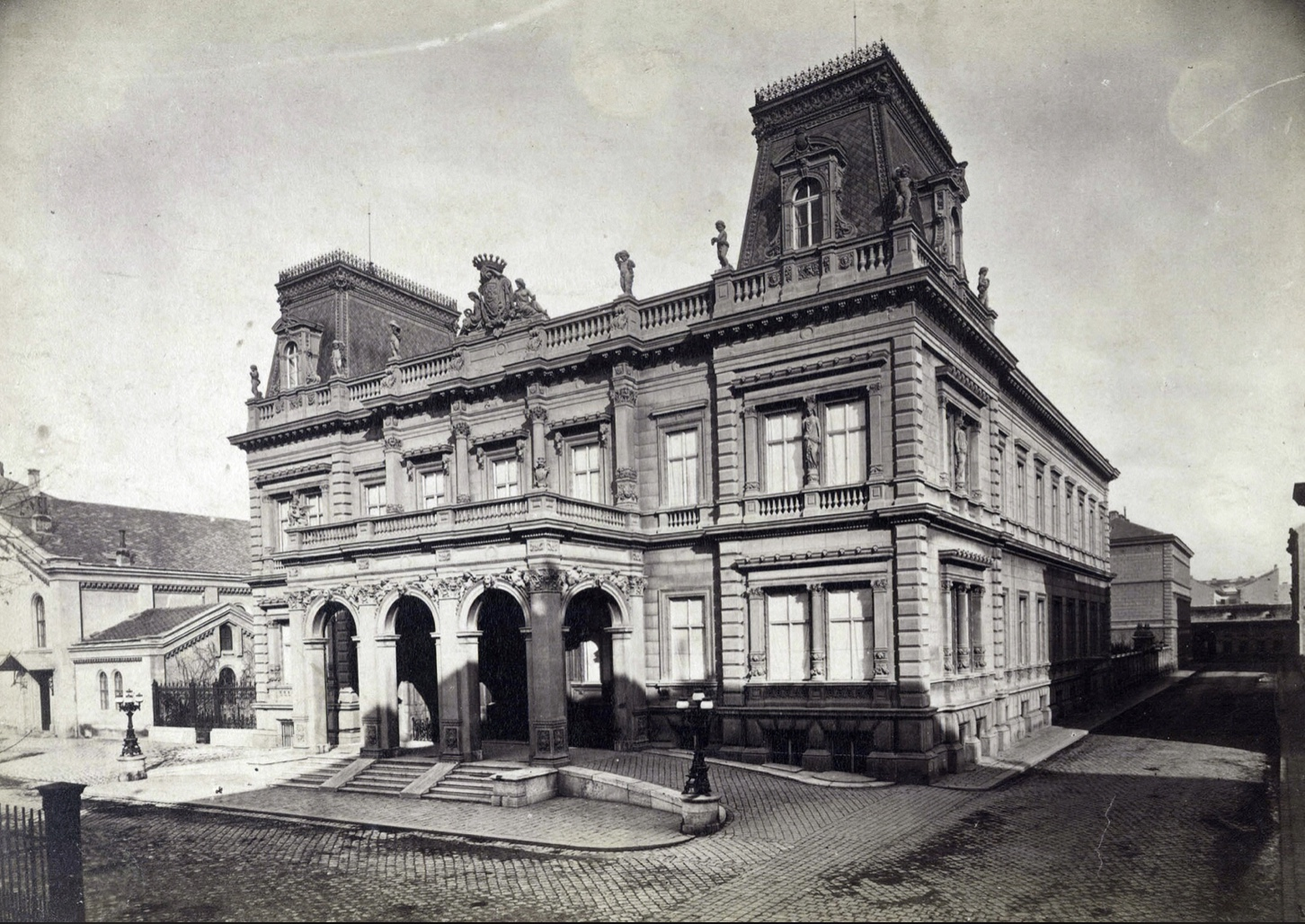
The Károlyi Palace, Pollack Mihály tér, (Miklós Ybl, 1865), in 1881. On the left of the building are the National Stables, demolished after the war and replaced with a five-story building in 1969.

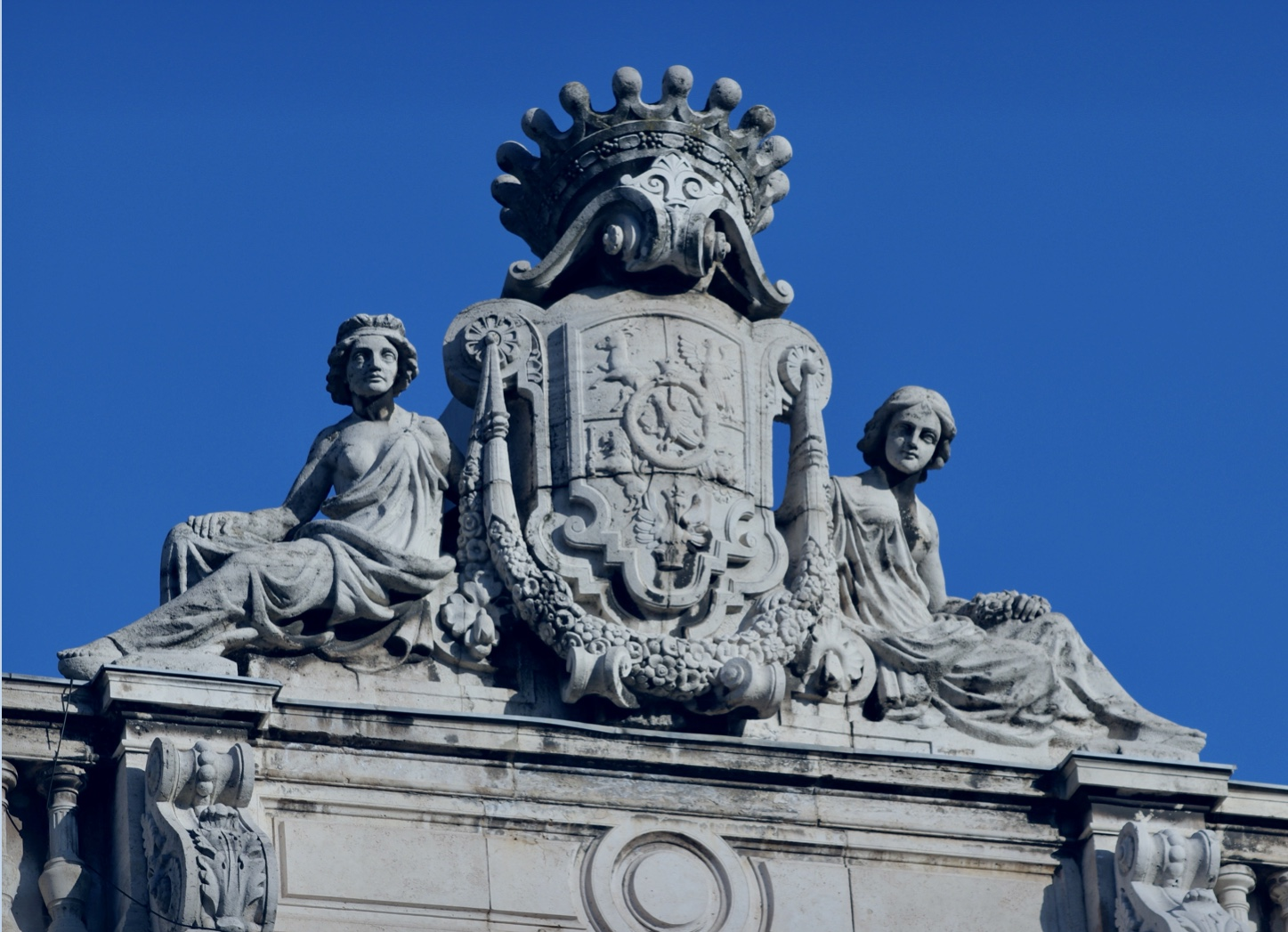
Pollack Mihály tér Királyi Palace (photo: Zsolt Dubnicsky)

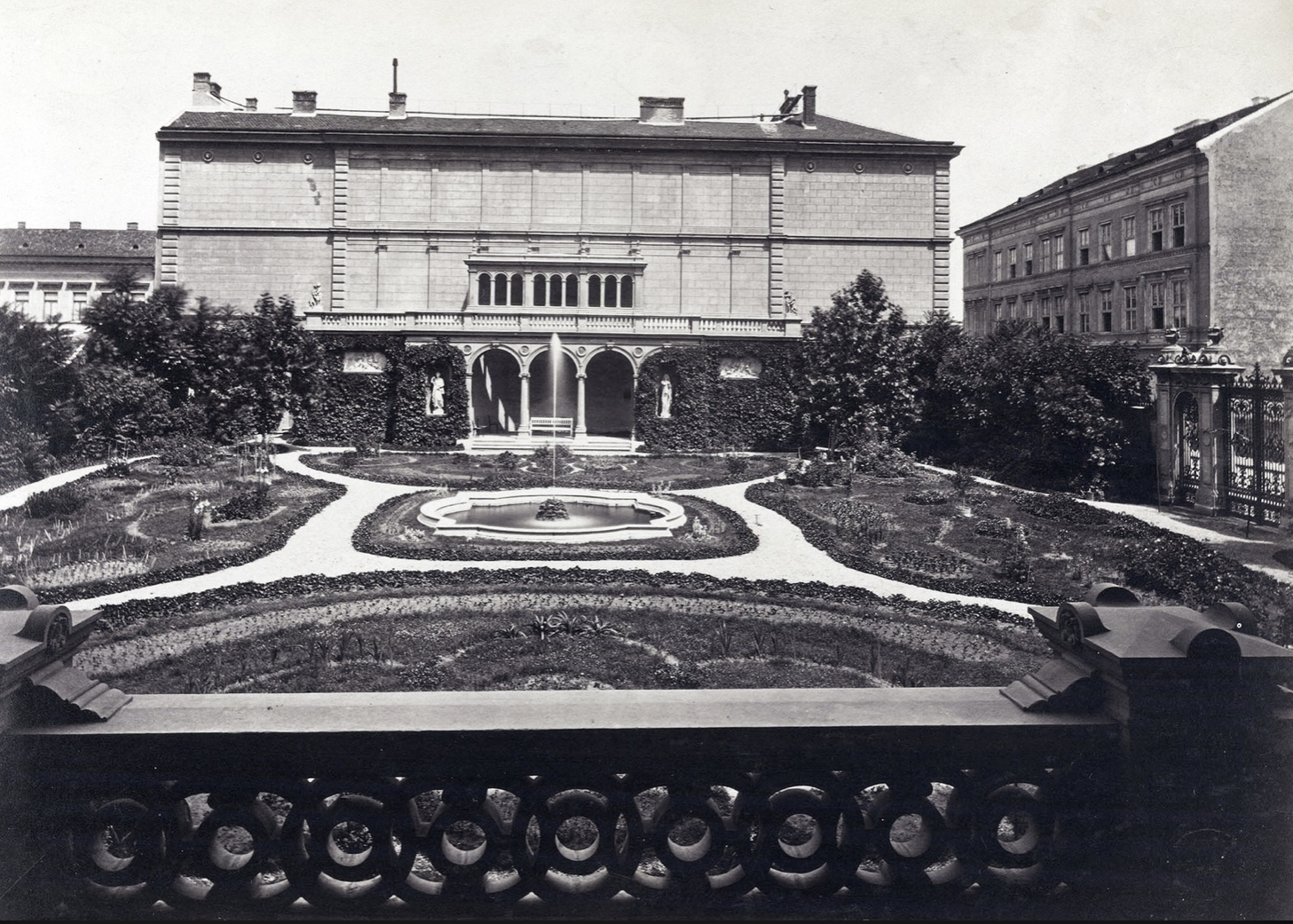
Garden of the Károlyi Palace, in 1881

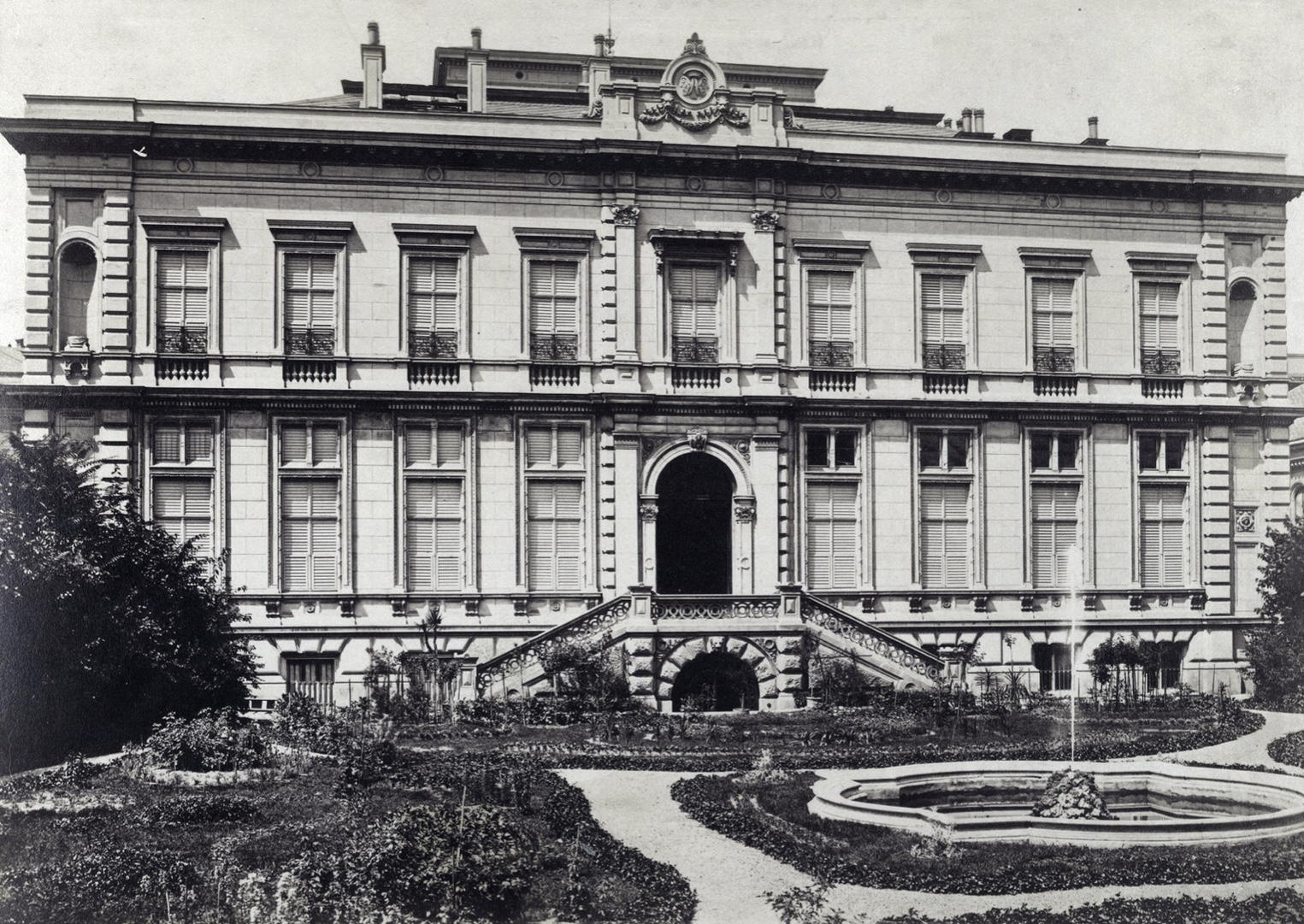
Rear of the Károlyi Palace, 1881

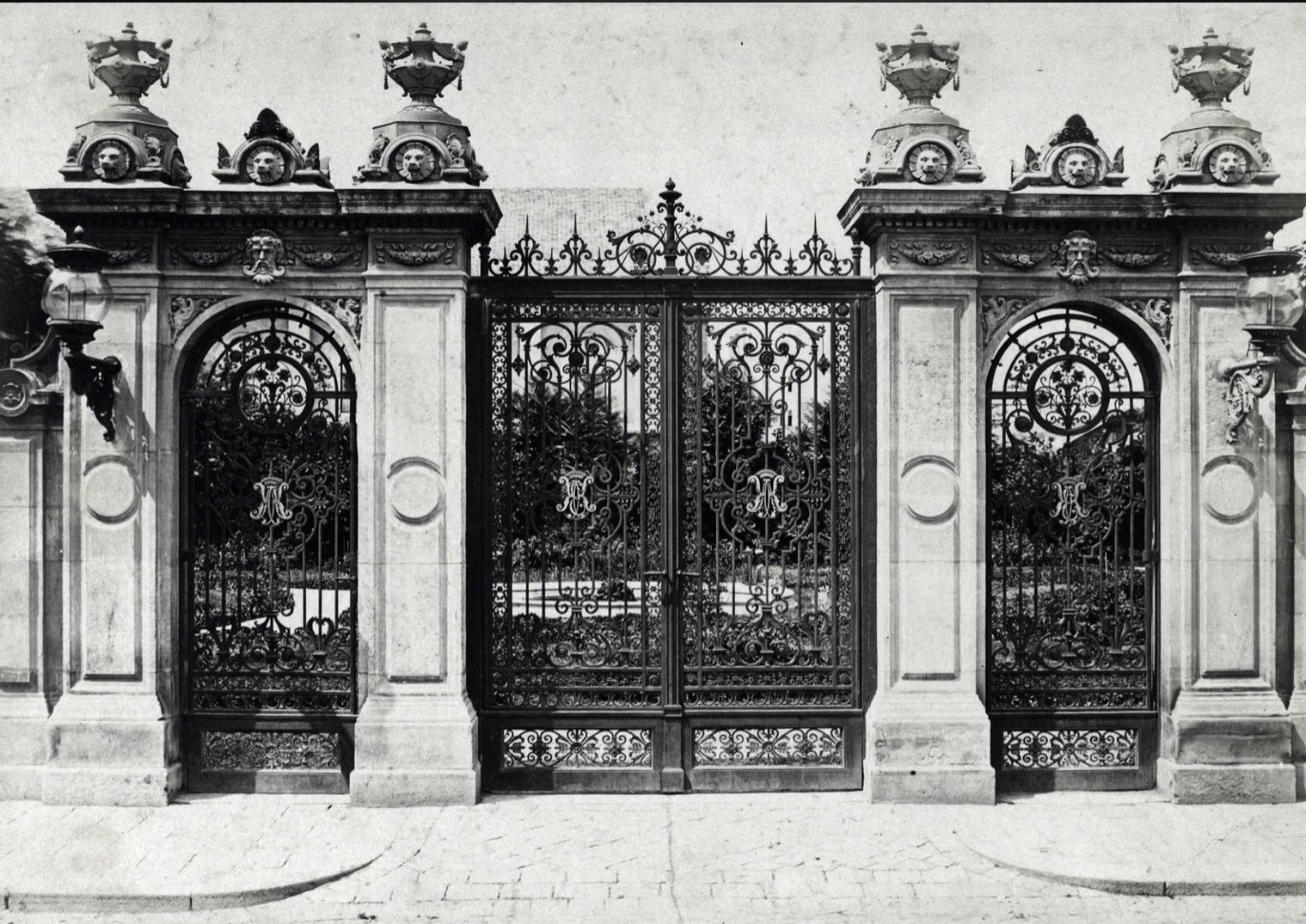
Garden gates at the Károlyi Palace, 1881

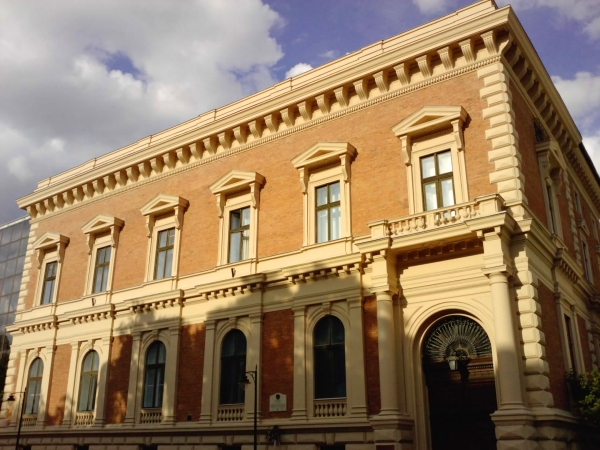
The Eszterházy Palace (Sándor Baumgarten, 1865), Pollack Mihály tér 8. 1946-1948 residence of the Hungarian President; today houses Hungarian Radio's Marble Room.

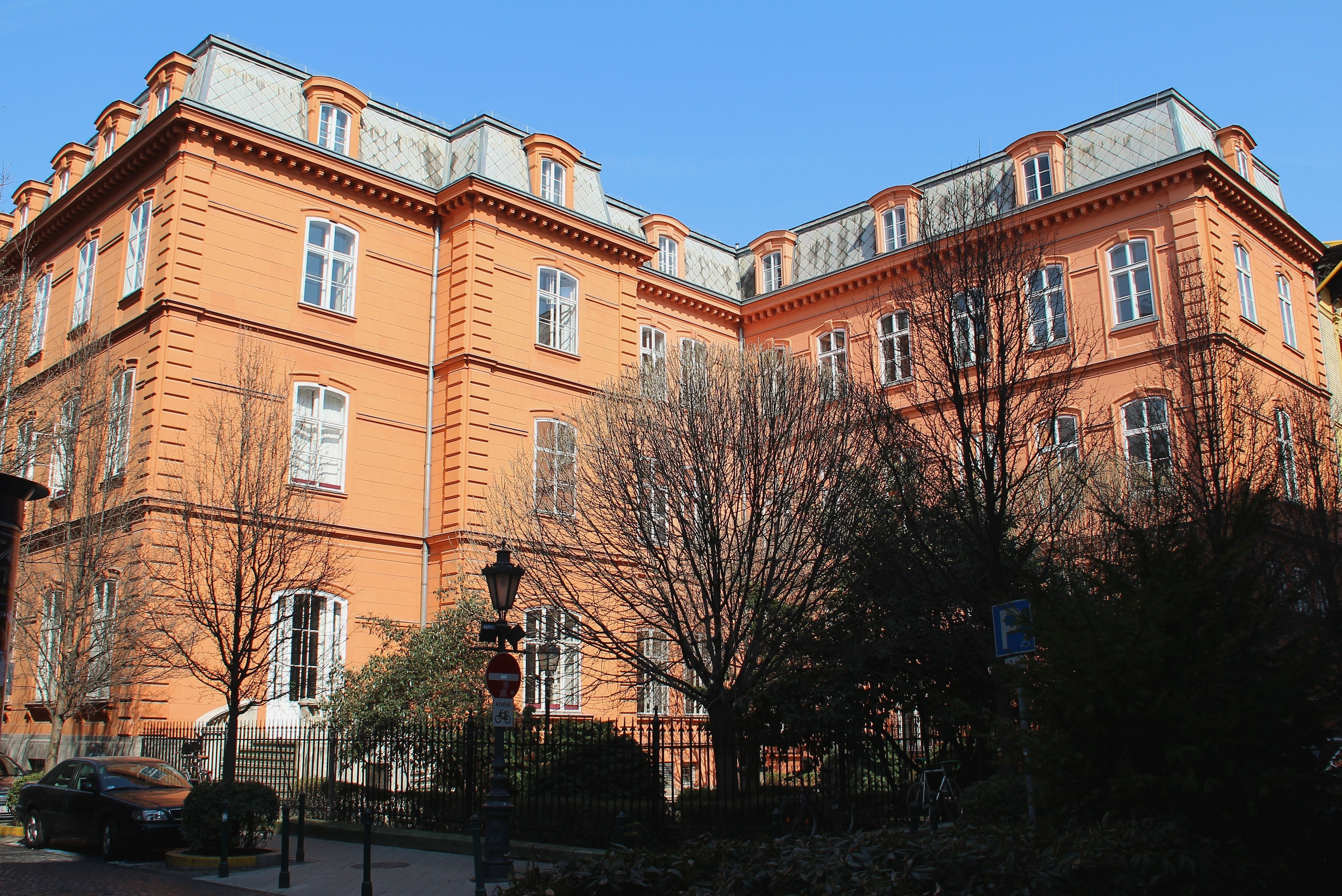
The Pálffy Palace Budapest, Miklós Ybl, 1867), Ötpacsirta utca 4/Reviczky utca 2. Built for Count János Palffy. Today the Metropolitan Szabó Ervin Library Music Collection.

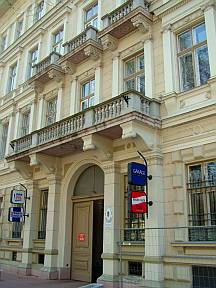
The Bókay Palace (Miklós Ybl,1870), Múzeum utca 9. Built for Built for János Bókay, a doctor.

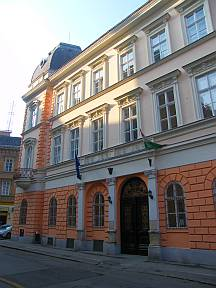
The Gottgeb House (Antal Gottgeb, 1870), Gyulai Pál utca 13. Built by Gottgeb, a master builder, for himself.

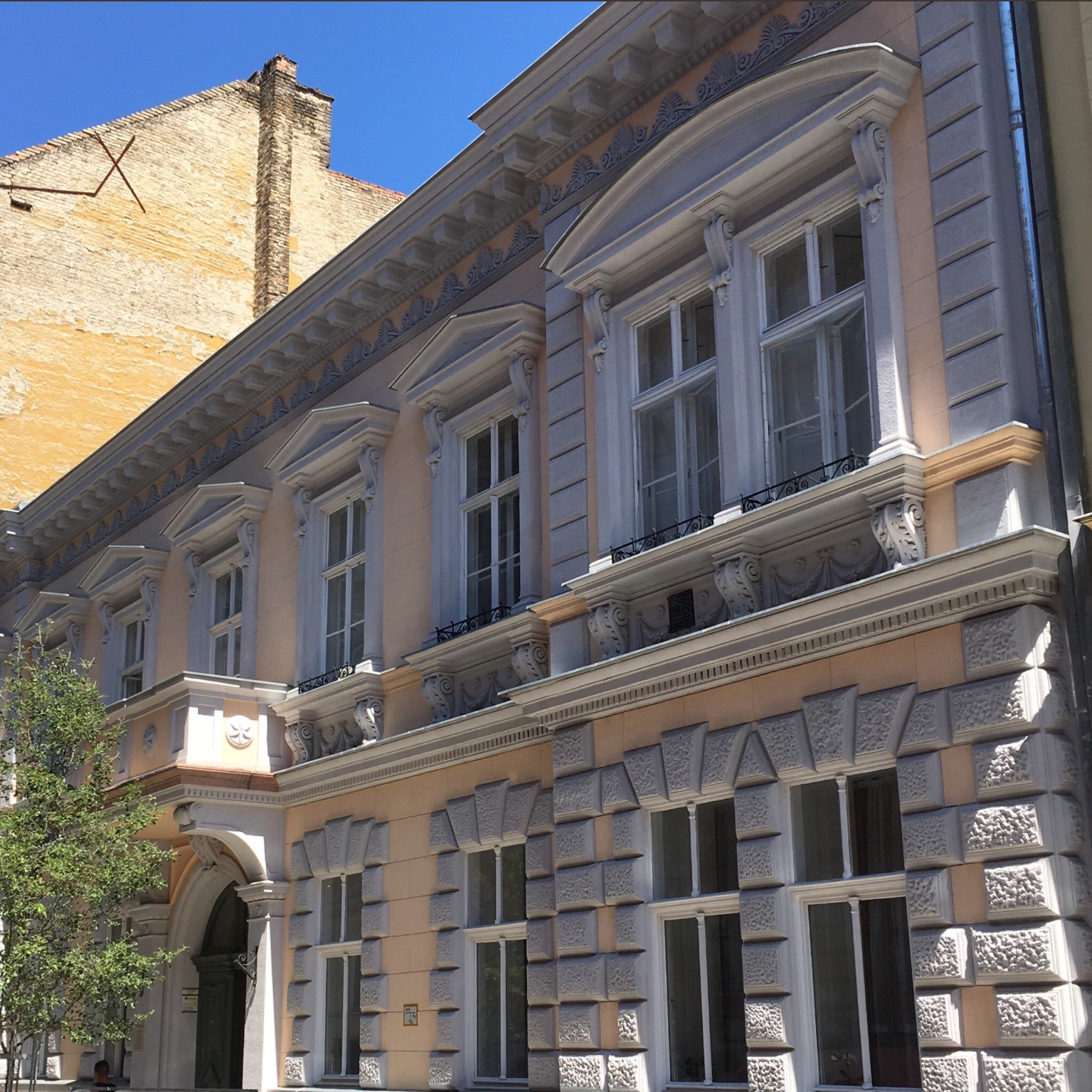
The Márffy-Mantuano Palace (Antal Gottgeb, 1871), Horánszky utca 4. It was later the residence of Austro-Hungarian diplomat in Rome Rezsö Márffy-Mantuano. His daughter, Judit Márffy-Mantuano de Versegh et Leno, later Judith Hare, Countess of Listowel, was born on the family estate at Kaposvár, Hungary, in 1903. She married William Hare, 5th Earl of Listowel in 1933.

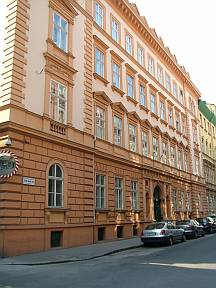
The Keglevich Palace (Ferenc Dötzer, 1871), Bródy Sándor utca 9. Built for Count István Keglevich, a Member of Parliament.

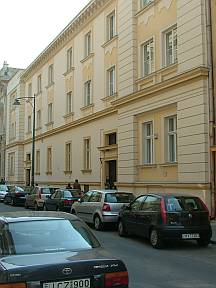
The Zichy House (Antal Skalnitzky, 1871), Múzeum utca 15. Built for a member of Count János Zichy's family.

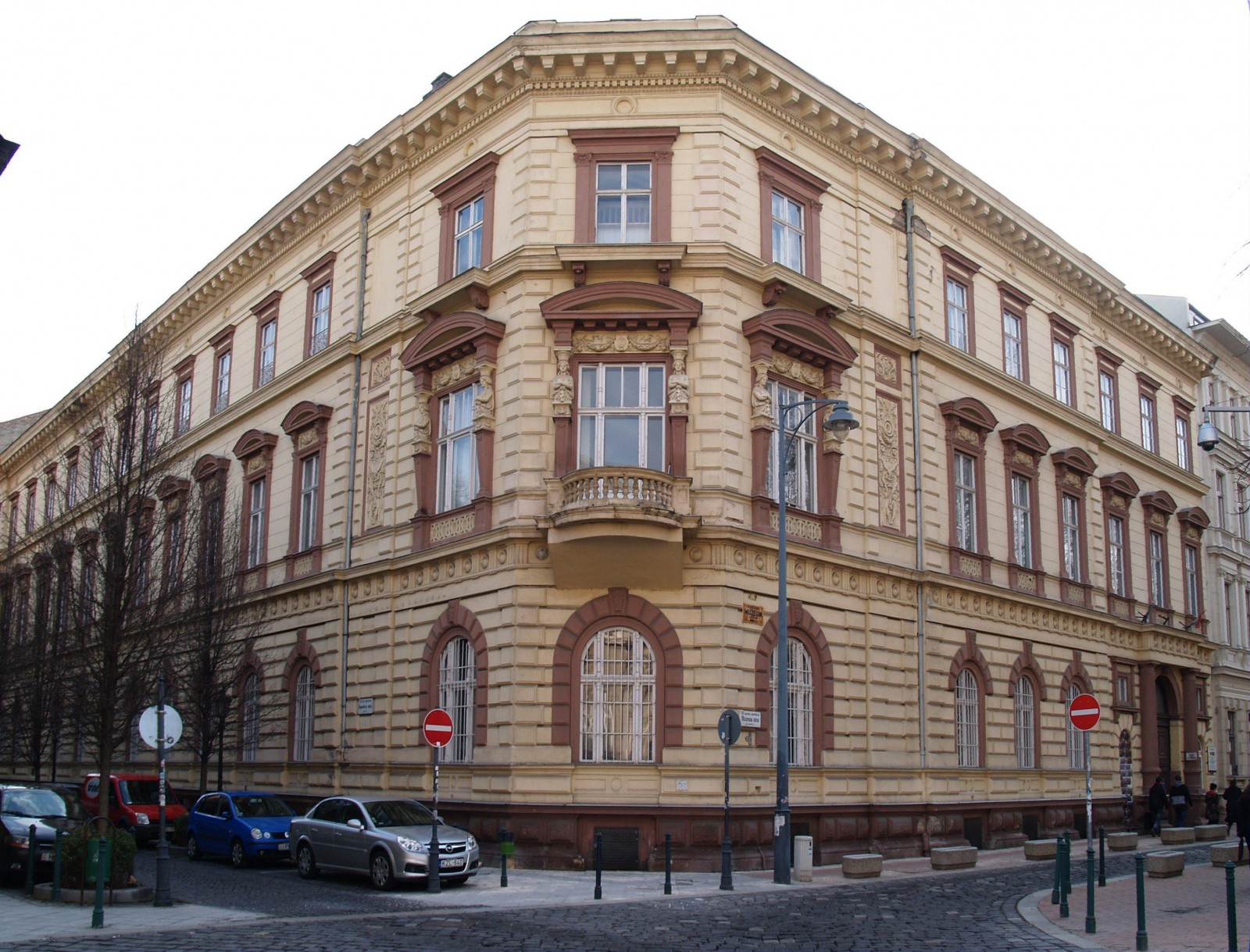
One of the district's four Károlyi Palaces (József Pucher and Antal Skalnitzky, 1871), Múzeum utca 11. Built for Count István Károlyi. Today used by the Hungarian State Railways (MÁV) Symphony Orchestra.

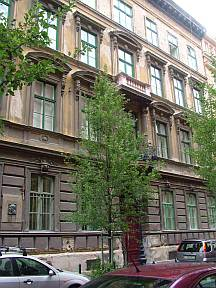
The Bánffy apartment building (bérház) (Károlyi Berg, 1871), Reviczky utca 7. Built for Count György Bánffy.

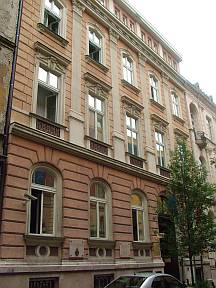
The Bánffy Palace (Miklos Bánffy, 1873), Reviczky utca 5. Built for Count György Bánffy.

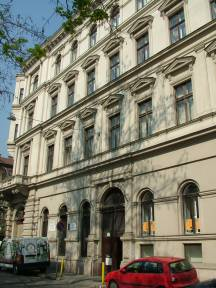
The Baron Fechtig House (Antal Skalnitzky, 1873) at Bródy Sándor utca 2. Built for Baron Nándor Fechtig. The ground floor houses the Múzeum Café and Restaurant, which has been in business (initially under the name Schodl) since the 1870s.

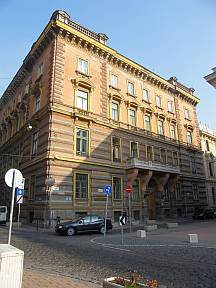
The variously known Odescalchi or Degenfeld-Schomburg Palace (Miklós Ybl,1874), Bródy Sándor utca 14. Built for Count Ágost Degenfeld-Schomburg.

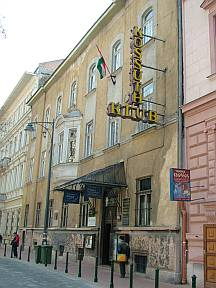
The variously-named Hadik Palace or Hasenfeld House (János Kauser, 1875), Múzeum utca 7. Built for Count János Zichy.

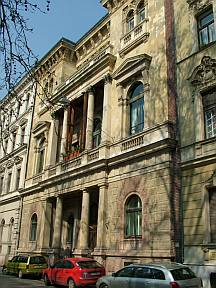
The Dessewffy Palace (Antal Weber, 1876), Bródy Sándor utca 4.

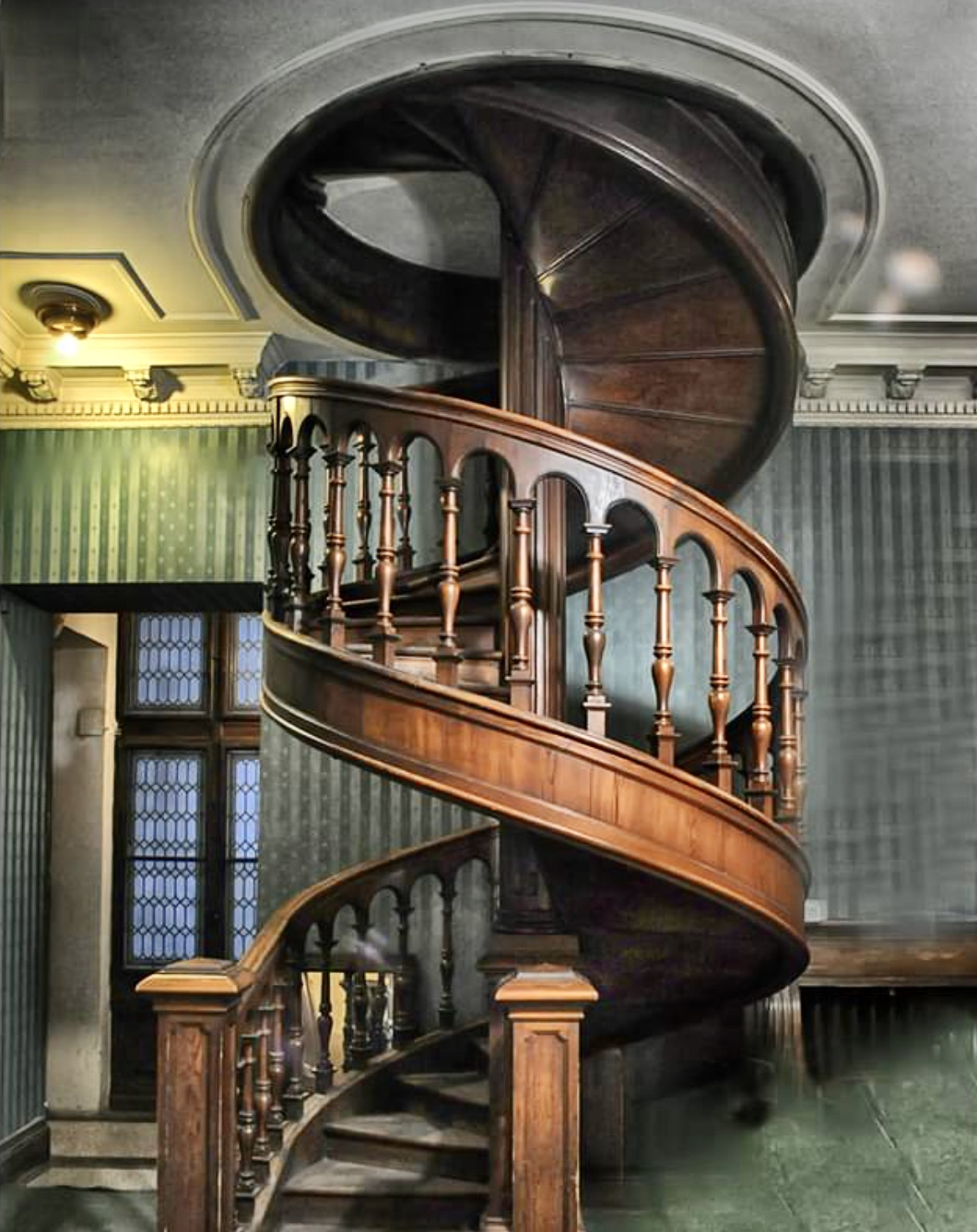
Dessewffy Palace (1876) staircase, Bródy Sándor 4 (Photo: György Jókúti)

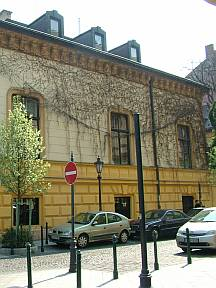
The Almassy House (Antal Gottgeb, 1877), Ötpacsirta utca 2. Built for Kálmán Almássy. Today the headquarters of the Hungarian Architects' Association

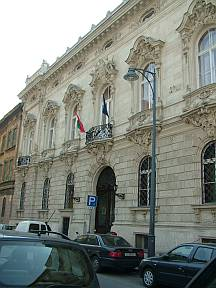
One of the four Károlyi Palaces in the district, known as the István Károlyi or Károlyi-Csekonics Palace (Fellner and Helmer, 1881), Múzeum utca 17. Built for Countess Károlyi, wife of Count István Károlyi.

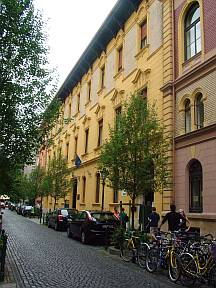
One of the Palotanegyed's two Wenckheim Palaces (György Dániel, 1889), Reviczky utca 4. Built for Baron Béla Wenckheim. From 1934 it was owned by Countess Széchenyi, wife of Count Antal Széchenyi.

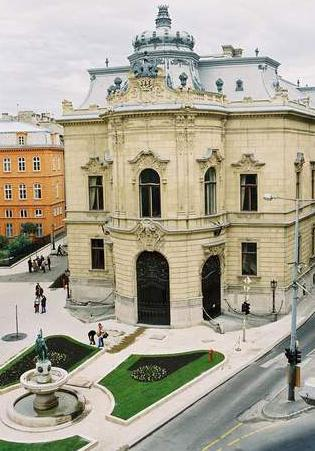
The Wenckheim Palace (József Pucher, 1890), Szabó Ervin tér 1. Built for Count Frigyes Wenckheim. Since 1931 Budapest's municipal library.

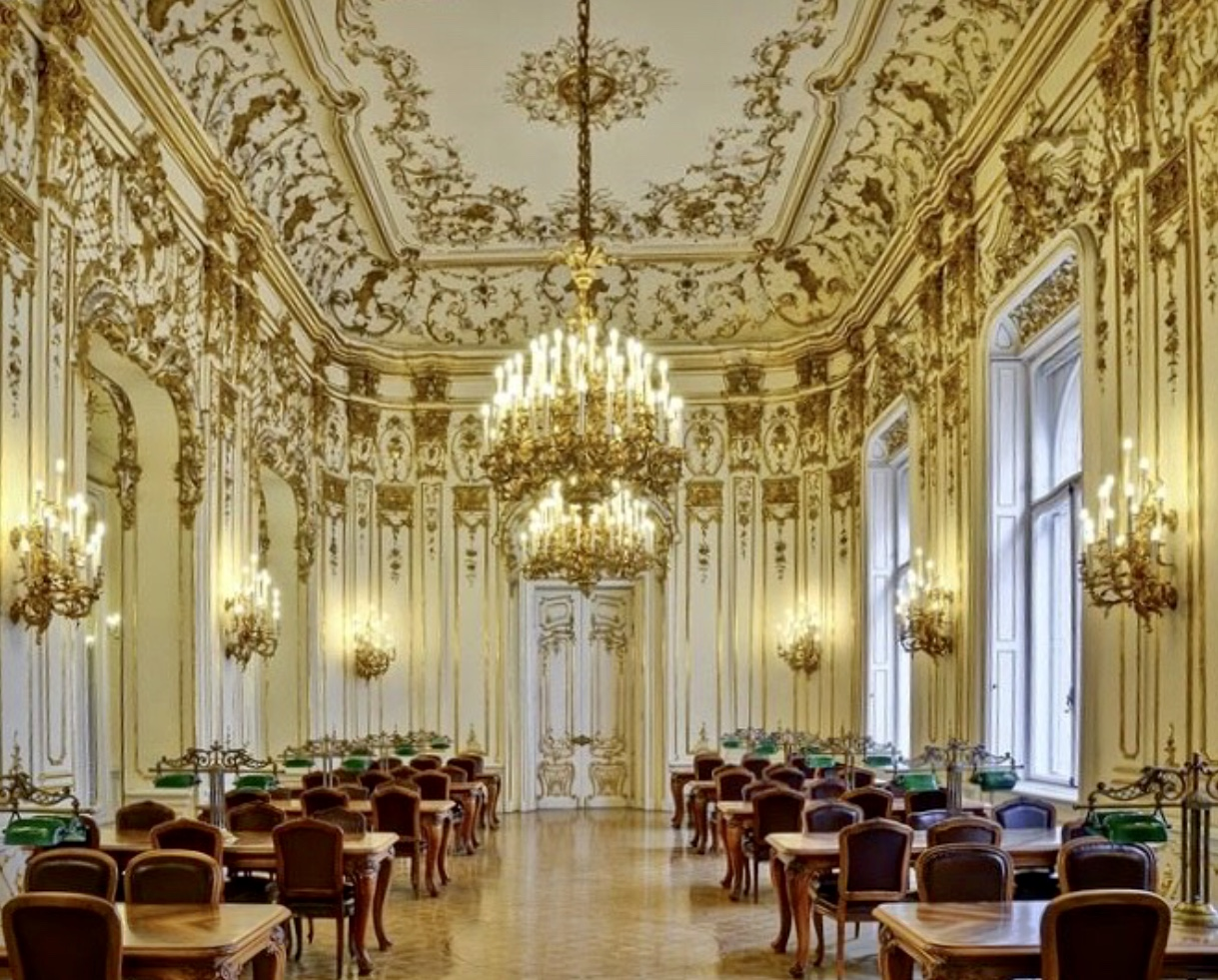
Wenckheim Palace, today the Szabó Ervin Library – a reading room

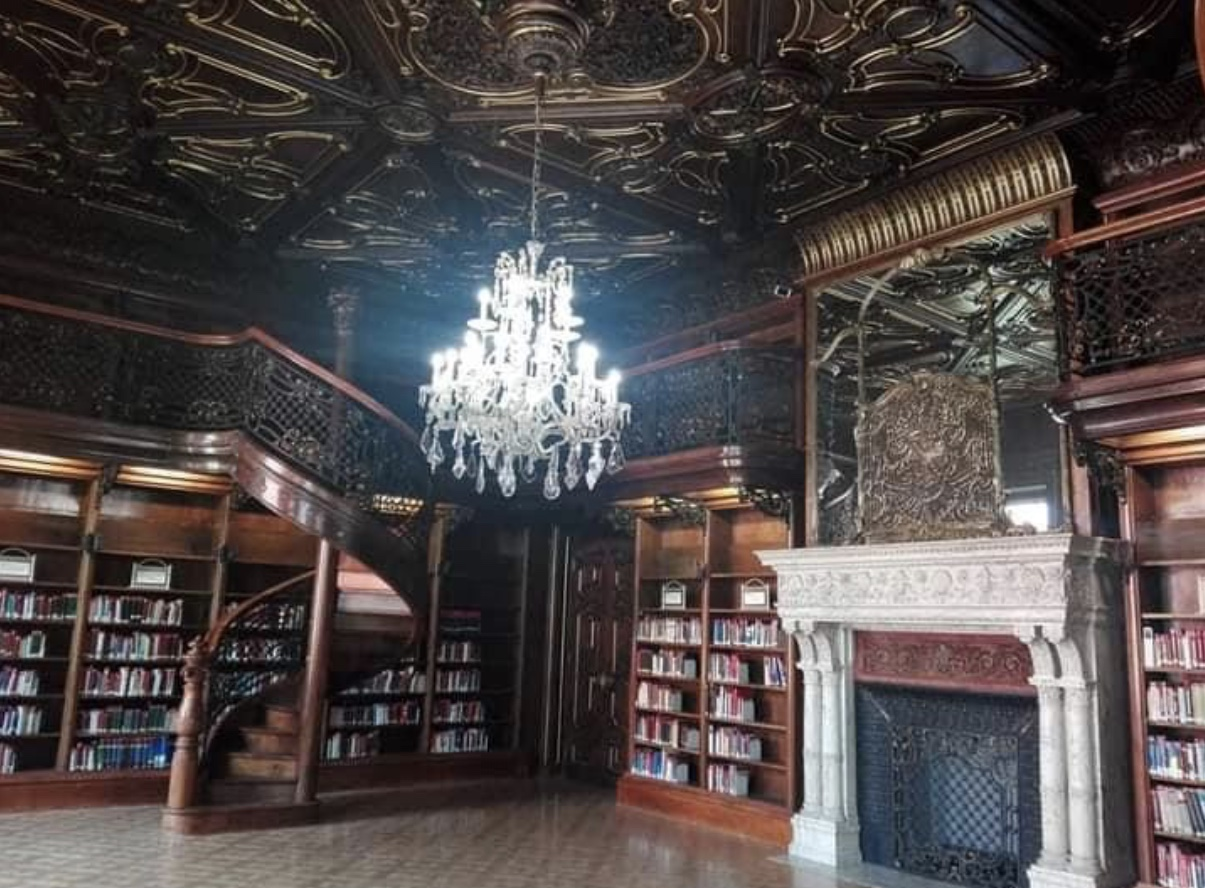
Wenckheim Palace – interior

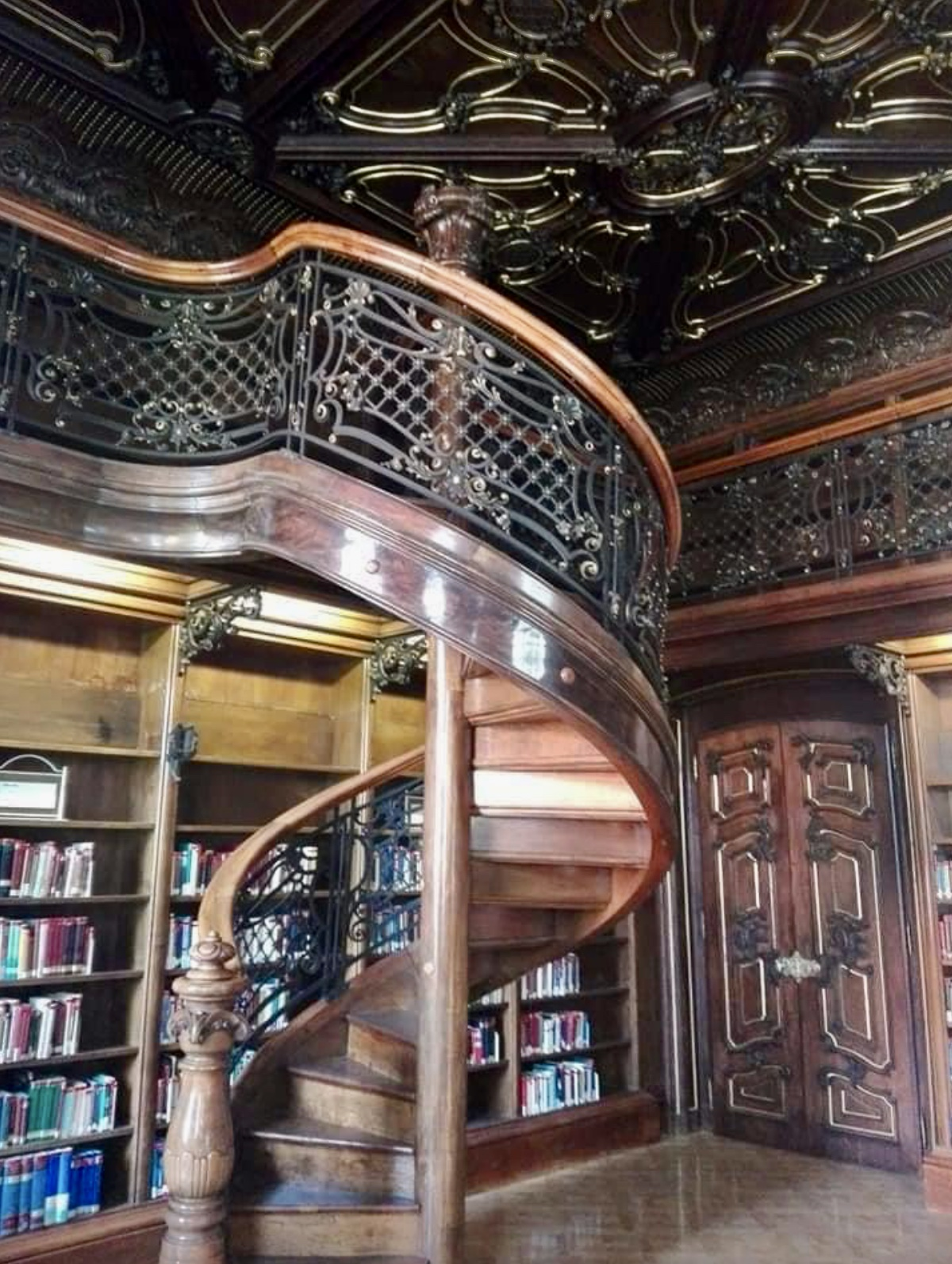
Wenckheim Palace – interior stairway

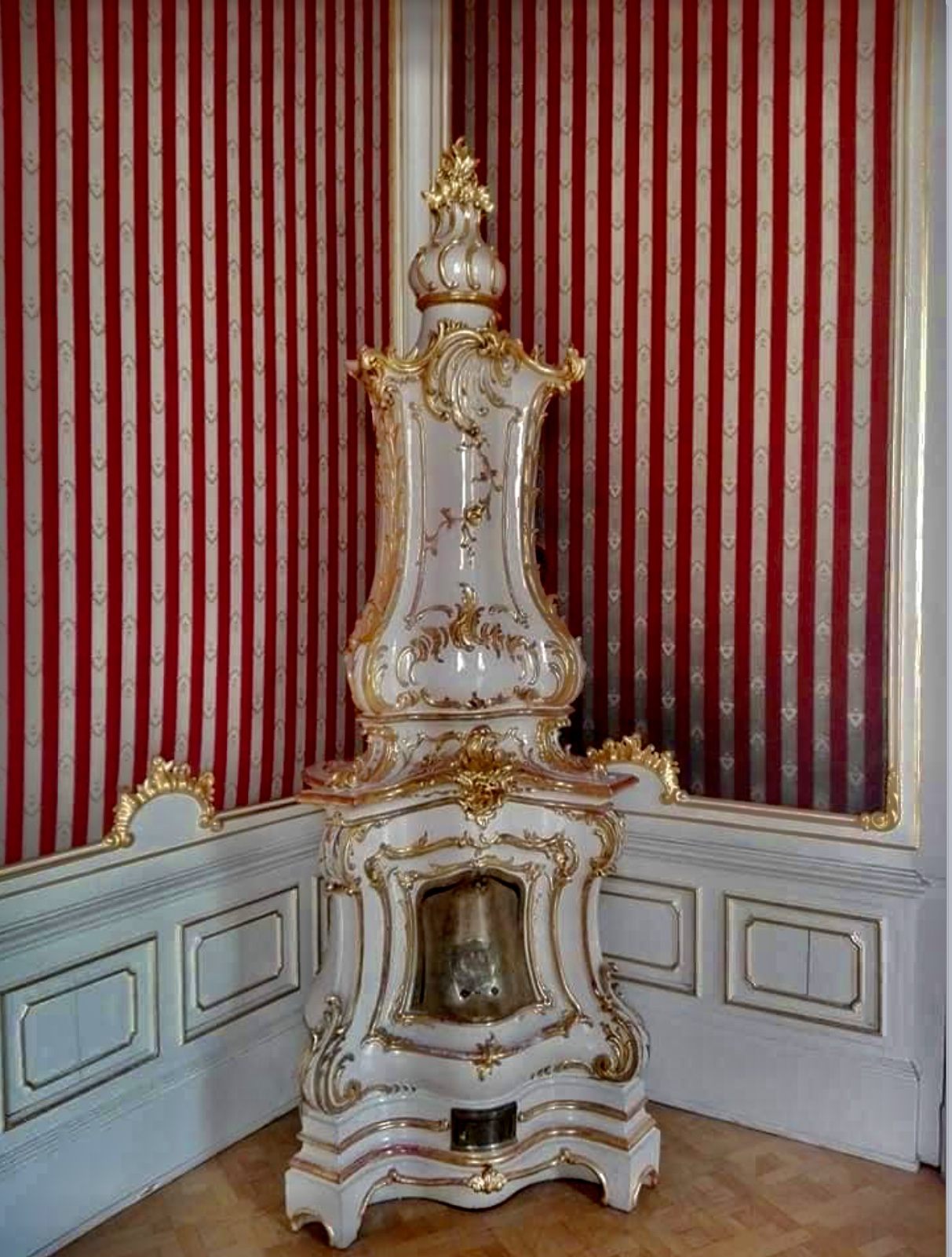
Wenckheim Palace – an original heating oven

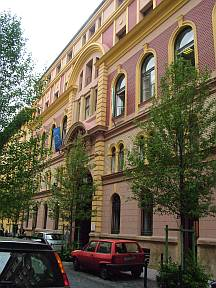
One of the district's four Károlyi Palaces (Artúr Meinig, 1890), Reviczky utca 6. Built for Count Sándor Károlyi.

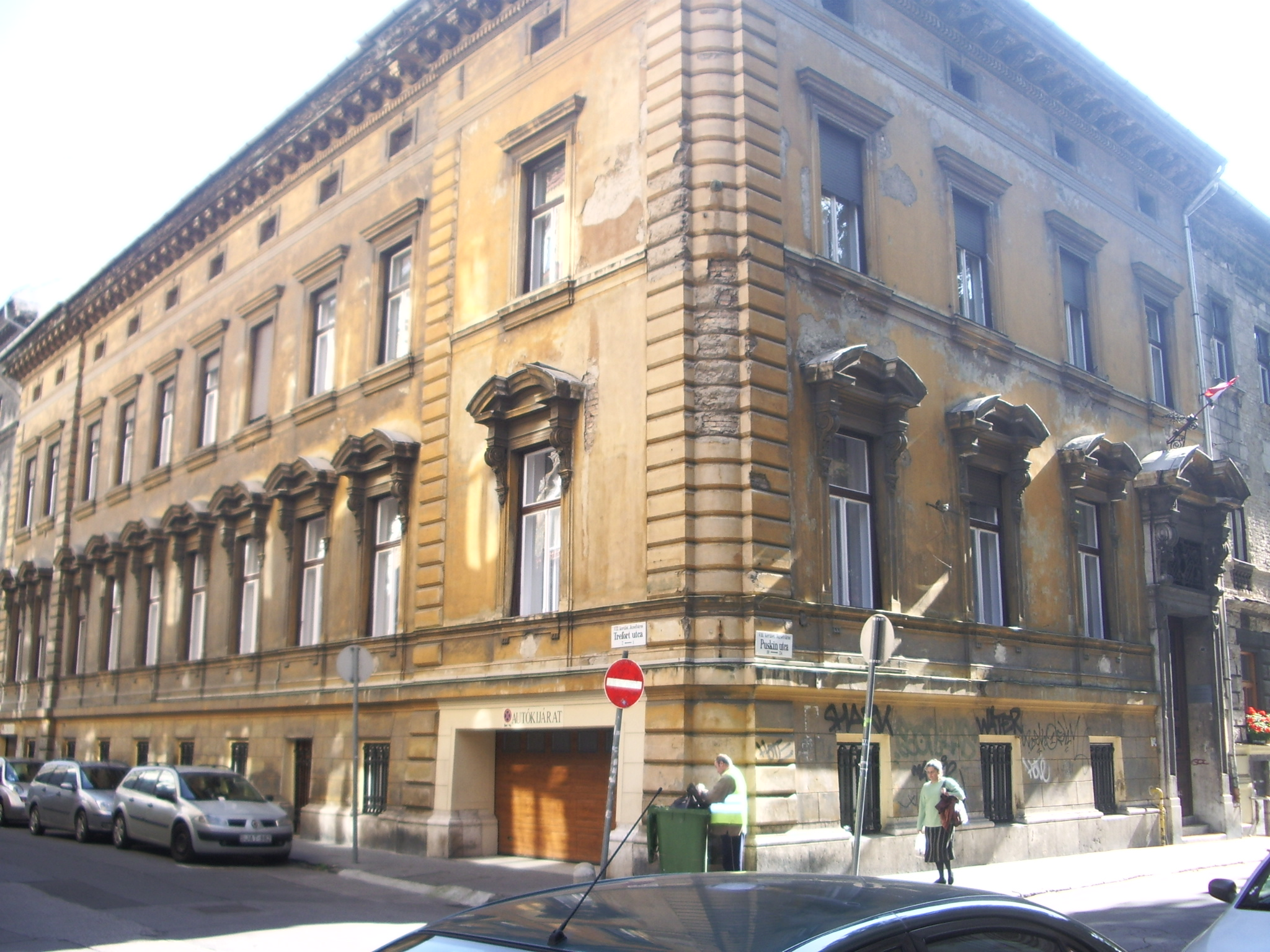
The Pulszky Palace (Arnold Nefanei, 1890) at Puskin utca 12/Trefort utca 1. Built for Ferenc Pulszky, the then-owner of the National Museum.

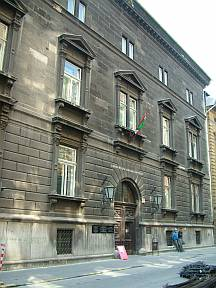
The Hunyady Palace (Artur Meinig, 1892), Trefort utca 3. Built for Count Imre Hunyadi. For many years the Józsefváros district centre for medical specialists, but as of July 2018 apparently empty.

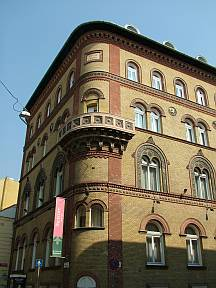
The Prónay Palace (Fridrich Lóránt, 1890), Trefort utca 2. Built for Gézá Rakovszky. Today the Hotel Mercure Budapest Museum.

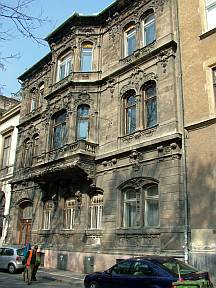
The Tauffer Palace (Ernő Schannen, 1892), Bródy Sándor utca 10. Built for Dr Vilmos Tauffer, an obstetrician.

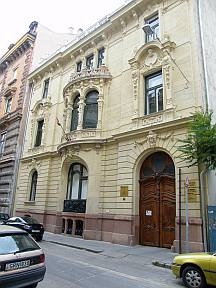
The Törley Palace (Rezső Ray, 1895), Bródy Sándor utca 16. Built for József Törley, champagne magnate.

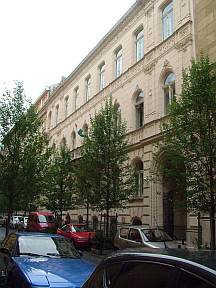
The Pejacsevich Palace (Elek Hofhauser, 1896), Reviczky utca 3. Built for Count Tivadar Pejacsevich, Ban of Croatia-Slavonia-Dalmatia

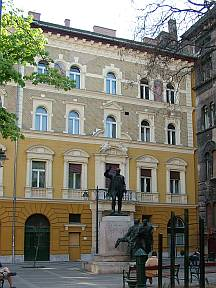
The variously-named Liebner or Darányi Palace (Sándor Stärk, 1896), Lőrinc pap tér 3. Built for then-agriculture minister Ignác Darányi.

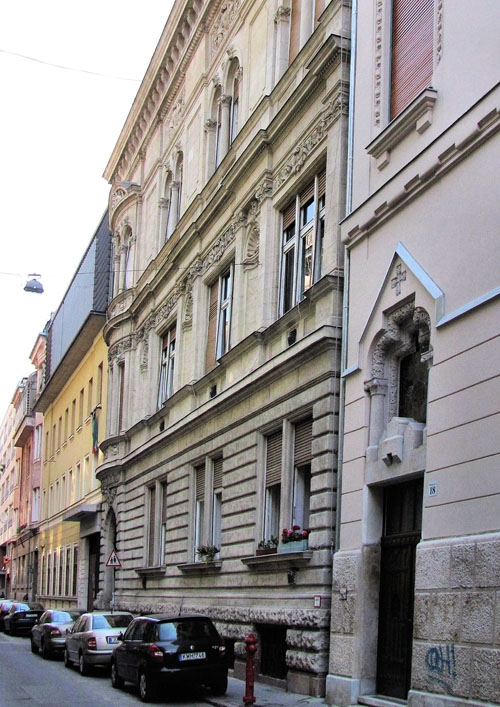
The Emich Palace (Ferenc Novák, 1896), Horánszky utca 16. Built for royal courtier and owner of the Athenaum printworks Gusztáv Emich as three enormous apartments, one on each floor. Sold in 1913 to Count Aurél Dessewffy, judge and Speaker of the-then House of Magnates.

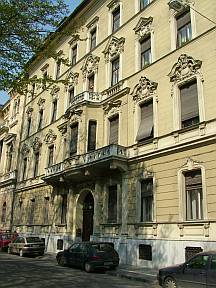
The Keszlerffy Palace (József Huber, 1897), Bródy Sándor utca 6. Built for János Keszlerffy, who was connected by marriage to Count György Károlyi.

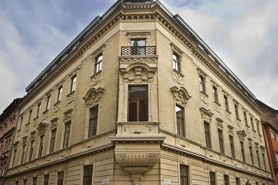
One of the district's three Zichy Palaces (Lipót Havel), 1897), Lőrinc pap tér 2. Built for Count Nándor Zichy. Today the Hotel Palazzo Zichy.

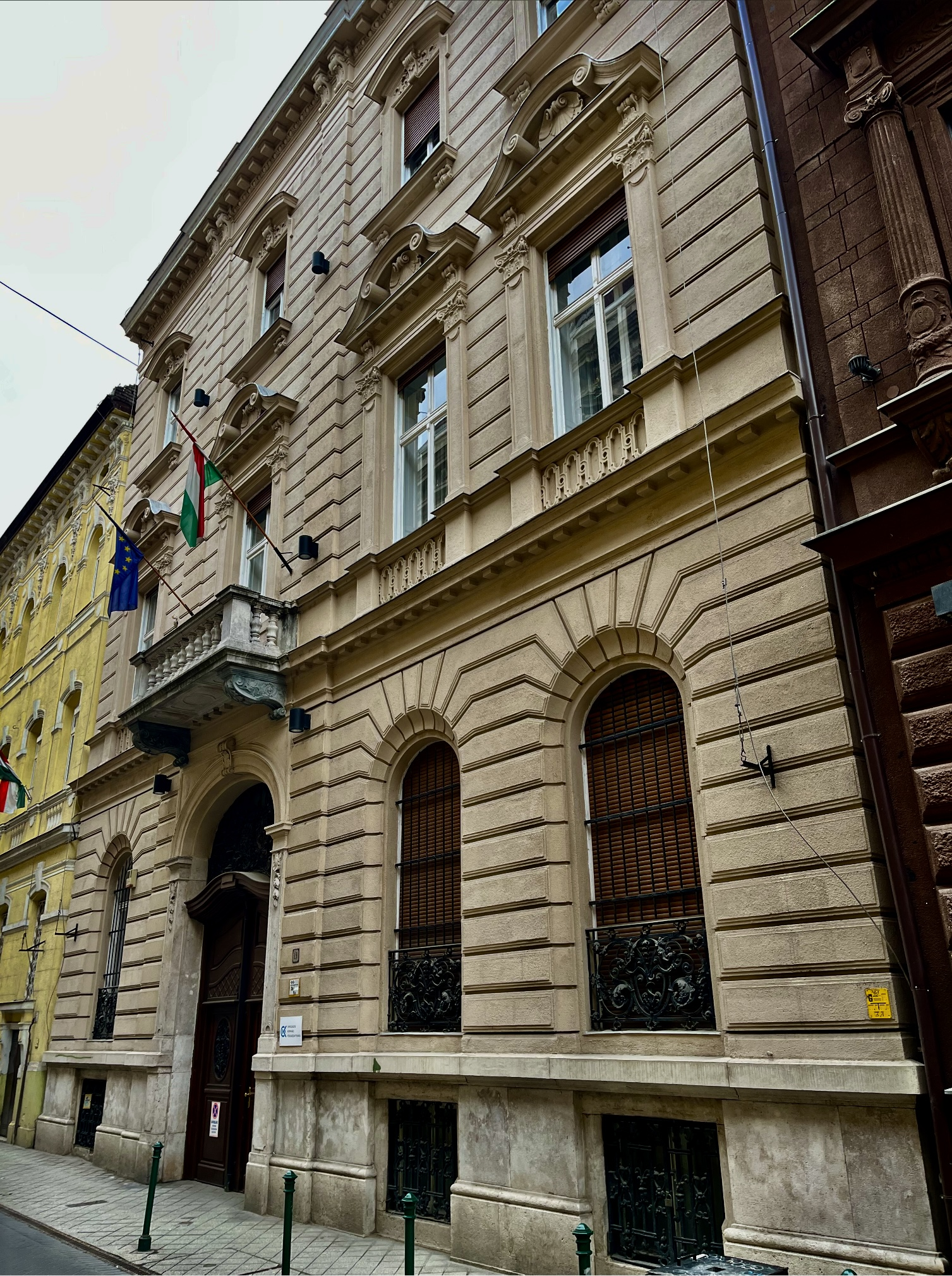
The Szentkereszty Palace at Horánszky utca 15. Built in 1898 for Transylvanian Baroness Maria Szentkereszty de Zágon,née Florescu de Floresti et Vizuresti, born in 1857 into the Florescu family from Wallachia/Moldavia with deep roots in the Romanian nobility. Her husband Béla was a member of the Hungarian Transylvanian nobility. Sándor Fort was the building's architect. The building became the Romanian legation in the 1920s. Raoul Bossy, Baroness Szentkereszty's nephew, became the minister in Hungary 1936-39. The embassy closed in August 1944 when Romania joined the allies. In 1956 it housed the Yugoslav embassy and briefly housed Prime Minister Imre Nagy. The Szentkereszty coat of arms still features above the gateway.

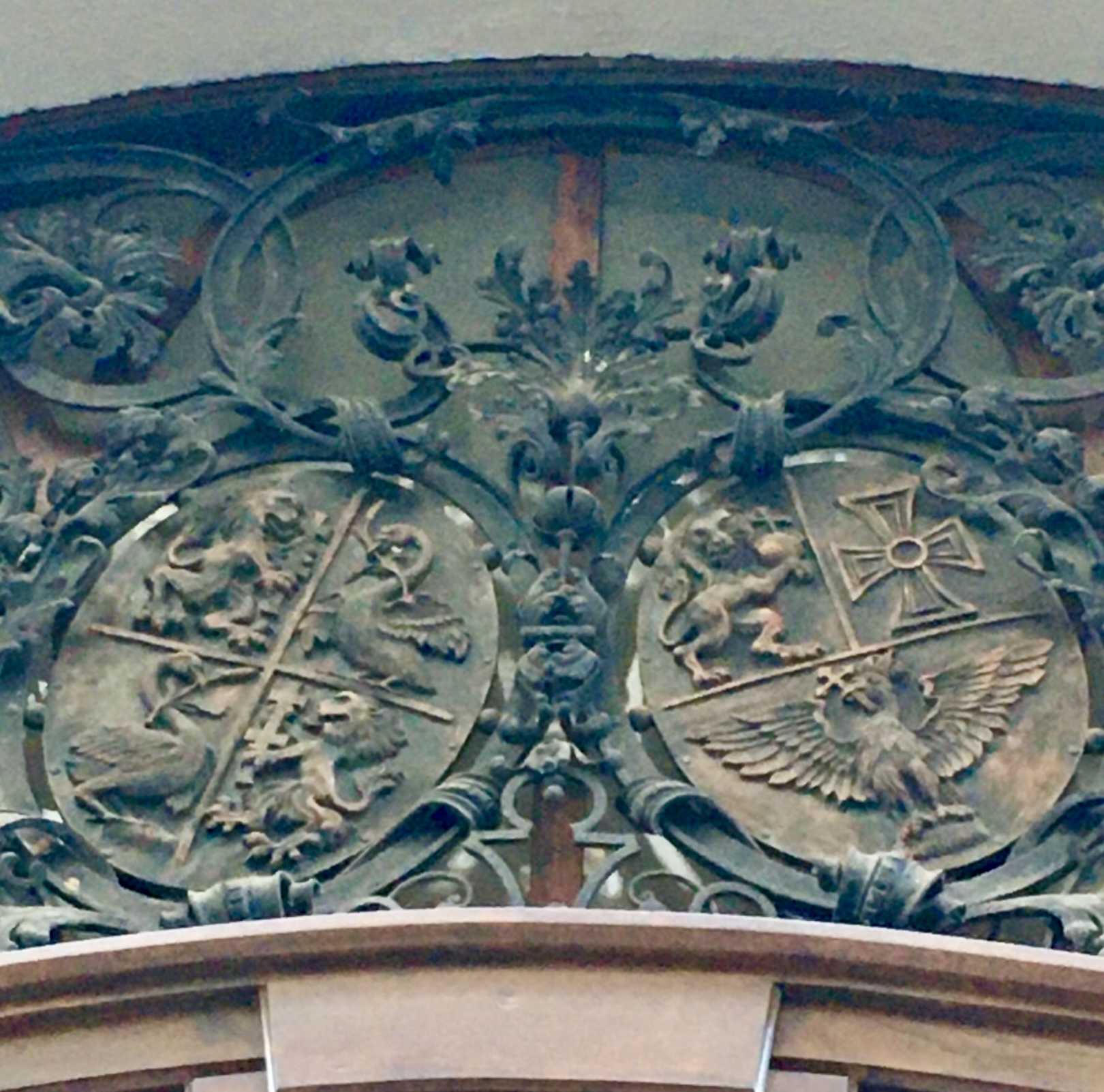
The Szentkereszty-Florescu coat of arms above the gateway at Horánszky utca 15

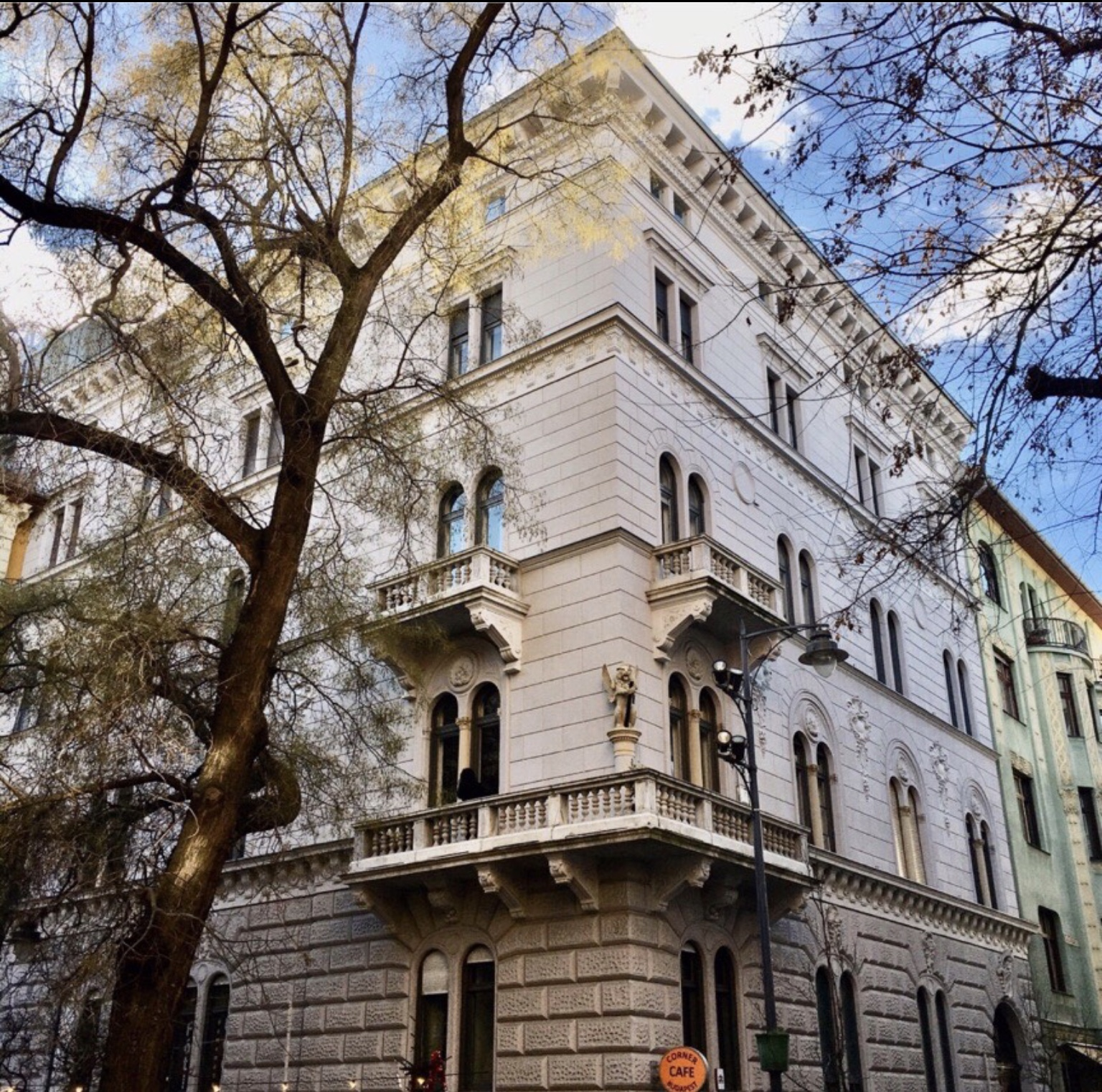
The elegant pile built for Count Henrik Reusz-Ráthonyi in 1898-9 at Krúdy utca 11 (the architect is unknown). A rural landowner, horse-breeder, and knight of the Order of Emperor Franz-Joseph, Reusz-Ráthonyi had a flat on the first floor – whose balcony is overlooked by the statue of a winged lion, symbols of Mark the Evangelist and Venice – and his coat of arms is still to be seen over the main entrance. The building later became a Catholic Girls’ College which, heroically, sheltered 150 Jews from Hungary’s Nazi regime during WWII. The building was in a seriously dilapidated condition for many years, but was beautifully restored 2016-18.

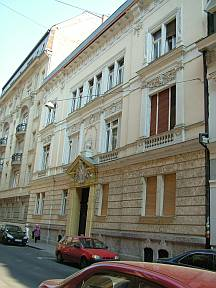
One of the district's three Zichy Palaces (Gyula Kauser, 1899), Szentkirályi utca 16 ). Built for a member of Count Nándor Zichy's family. Today an apartment building.

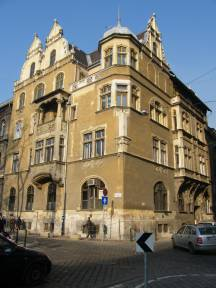
The Gschwindt Palace (Sándor Tóth, 1901), Puskin utca 19/Bródy Sándor utca 12. Built for György Gschwindt, a wealthy businessman.

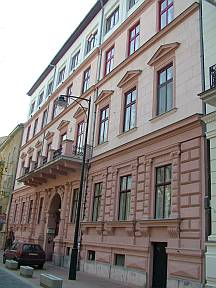
The Hadik-Barkóczy Palace (Ede Lux, 1912), Múzeum utca 5. Built for Count Endre Hadik-Barkóczy.
