= Mihály Pollack =

Austrian-born Hungarian architect

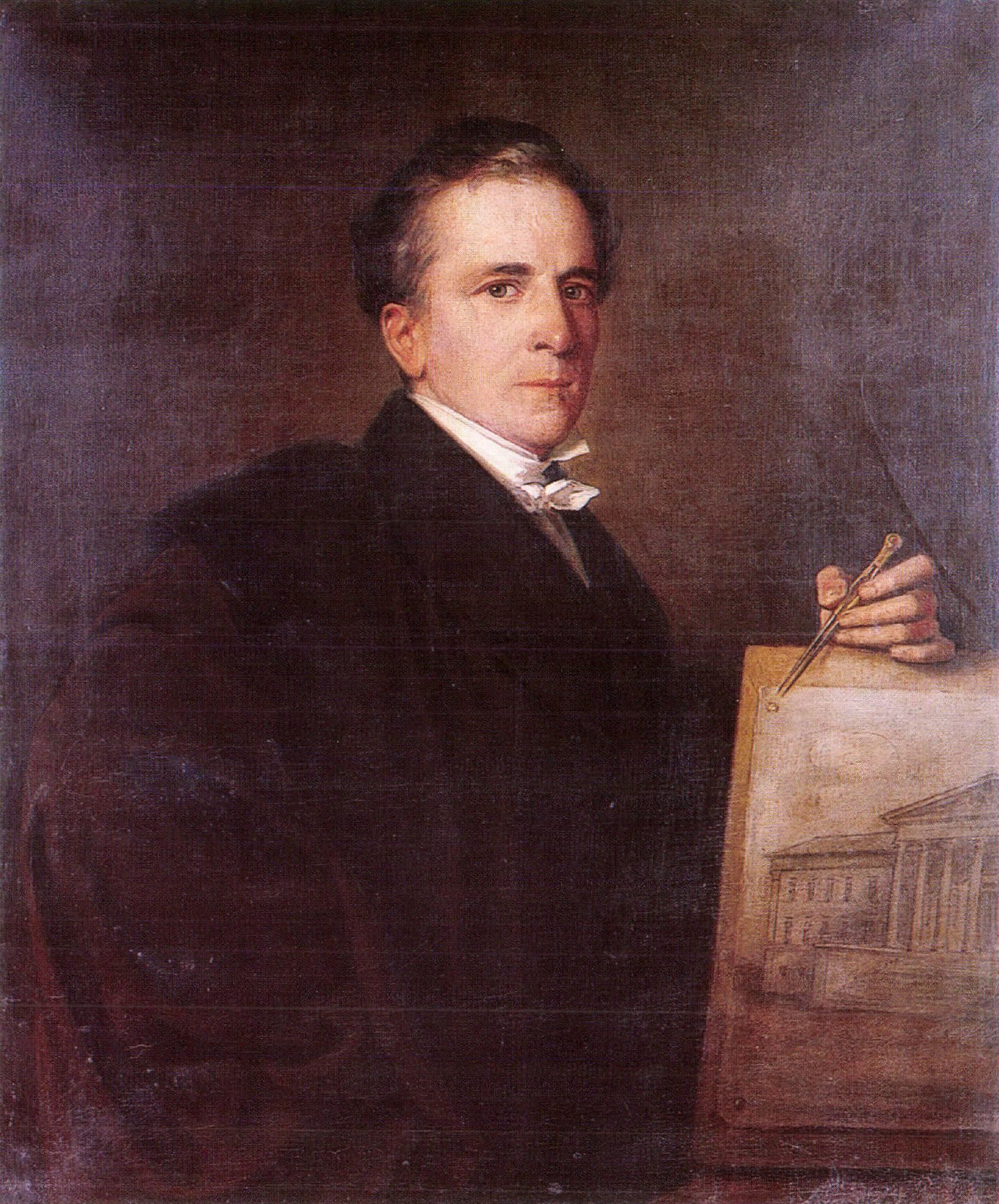
- Portrait of Mihály Pollack from ca.1850, oil on canvas by Mór Than
- Born: Michael Pollack; 30 August 1773; Vienna, Archduchy of Austria
- Died: 3 January 1855; Pest, Kingdom of Hungary, Austrian Empire
- Other name: Mihály Pollák
- Education: TU Wien, Vienna
- Occupation: Architect
- Buildings: Hungarian National Museum, Budapest

Mihály Pollack (né Michael Pollack; 30 August 1773 — 3 January 1855) was an Austrian-born Hungarian architect, key figure of neoclassical architecture. His main work is the Hungarian National Museum (1837–46).

Michael Pollack, later known as Mihály Pollack, was born in Vienna in 1773. Between 1793-94, he moved to Milan to his half-brother architect Leopold Pollack. In 1798, he moved to Pest, where in 1808 he took a lead role in the city's Beautification Commission, and became increasingly influential.

Between 1810 and 1830 he designed many residential buildings, later larger palaces and public buildings. His architectural expression progressed from baroque towards neoclassical style. He died, aged 81, in Pest.

== Designed buildings by Mihály Pollack ==
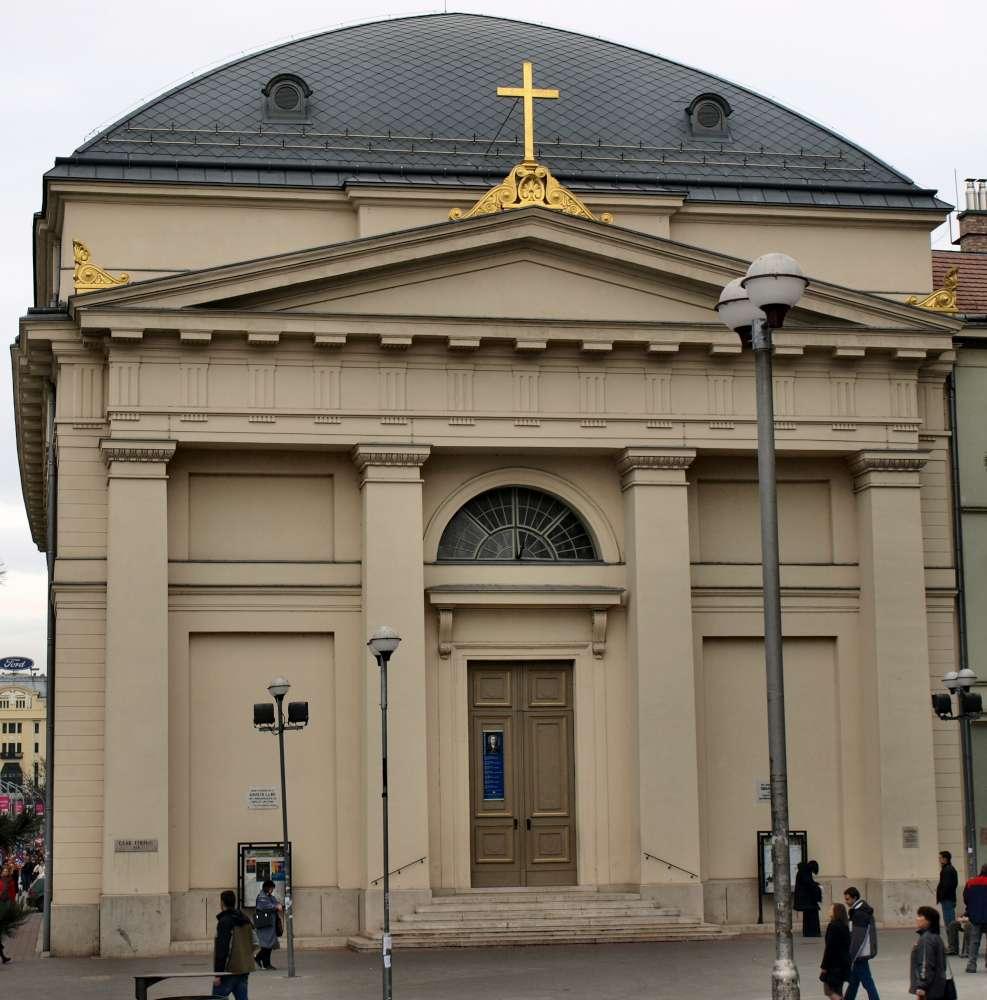
Lutheran church (1799–1808), Deák Ferenc tér, Budapest

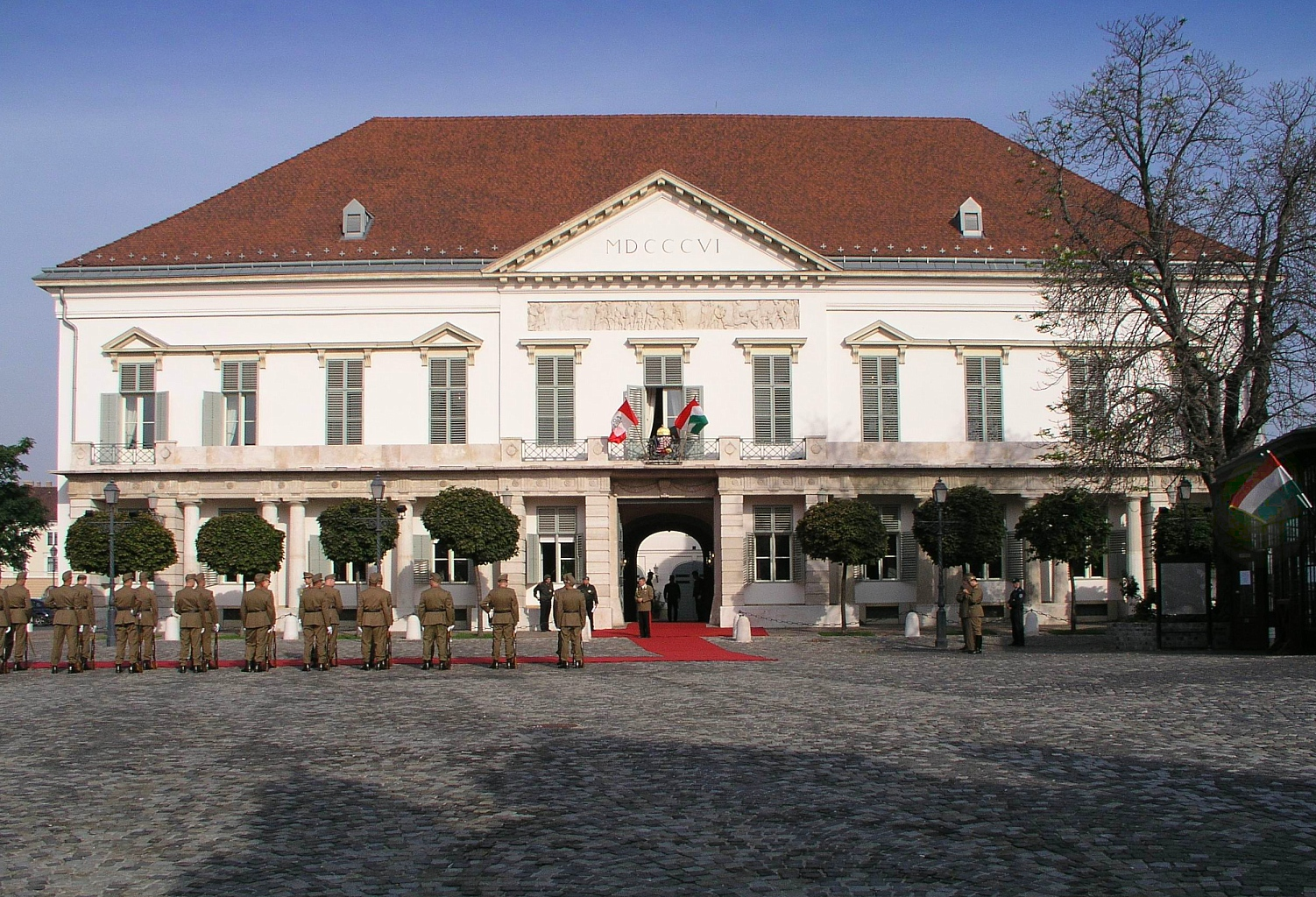
Sándor Palace (1803–1806), Buda Castle Quarter, Budapest

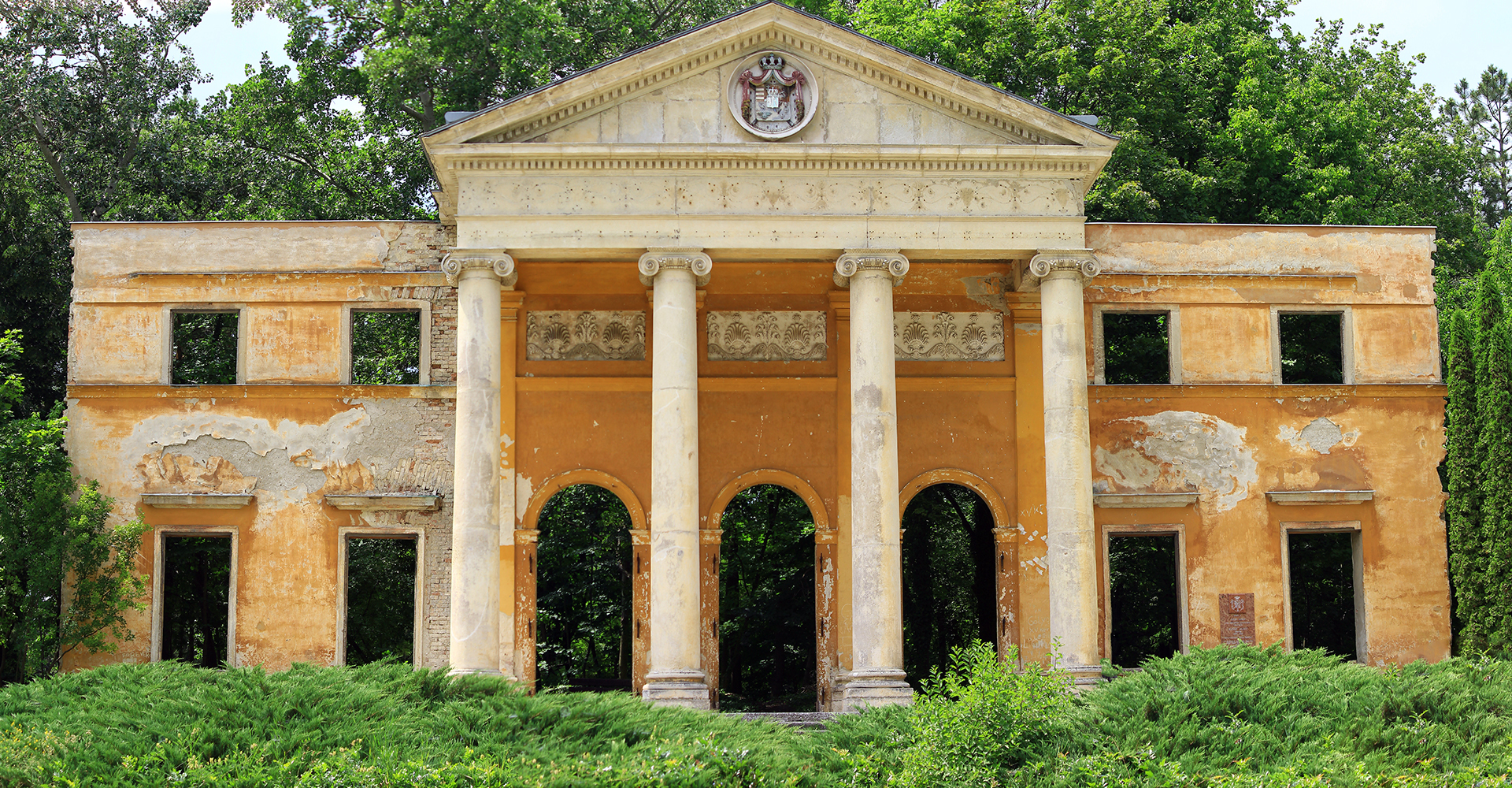
Ruins of Alcsút Palace of Archduke Joseph, Alcsútdoboz (1819–1827)

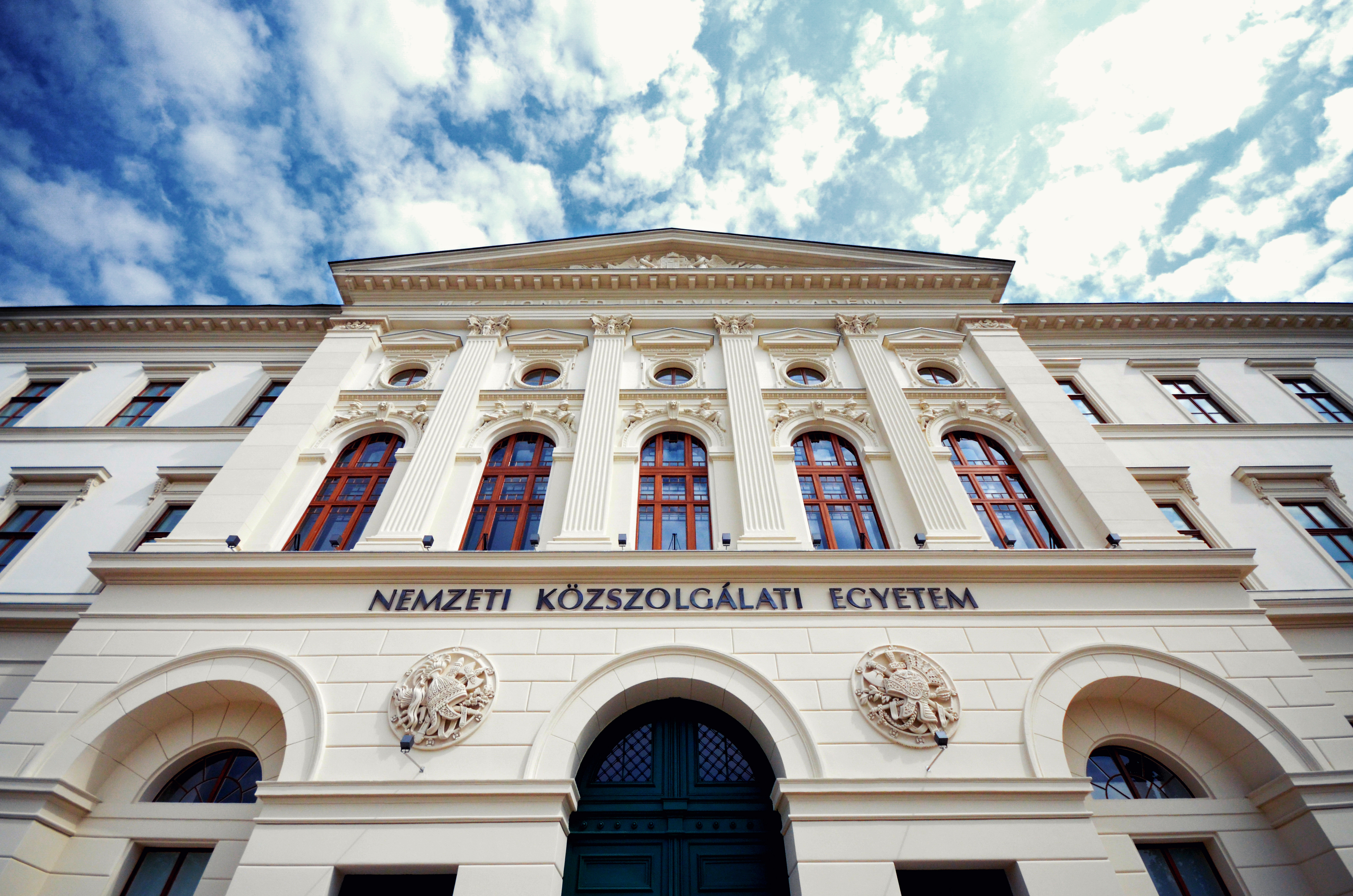
Ludovica Academy (1831–1836), Ludovika Campus, Budapest

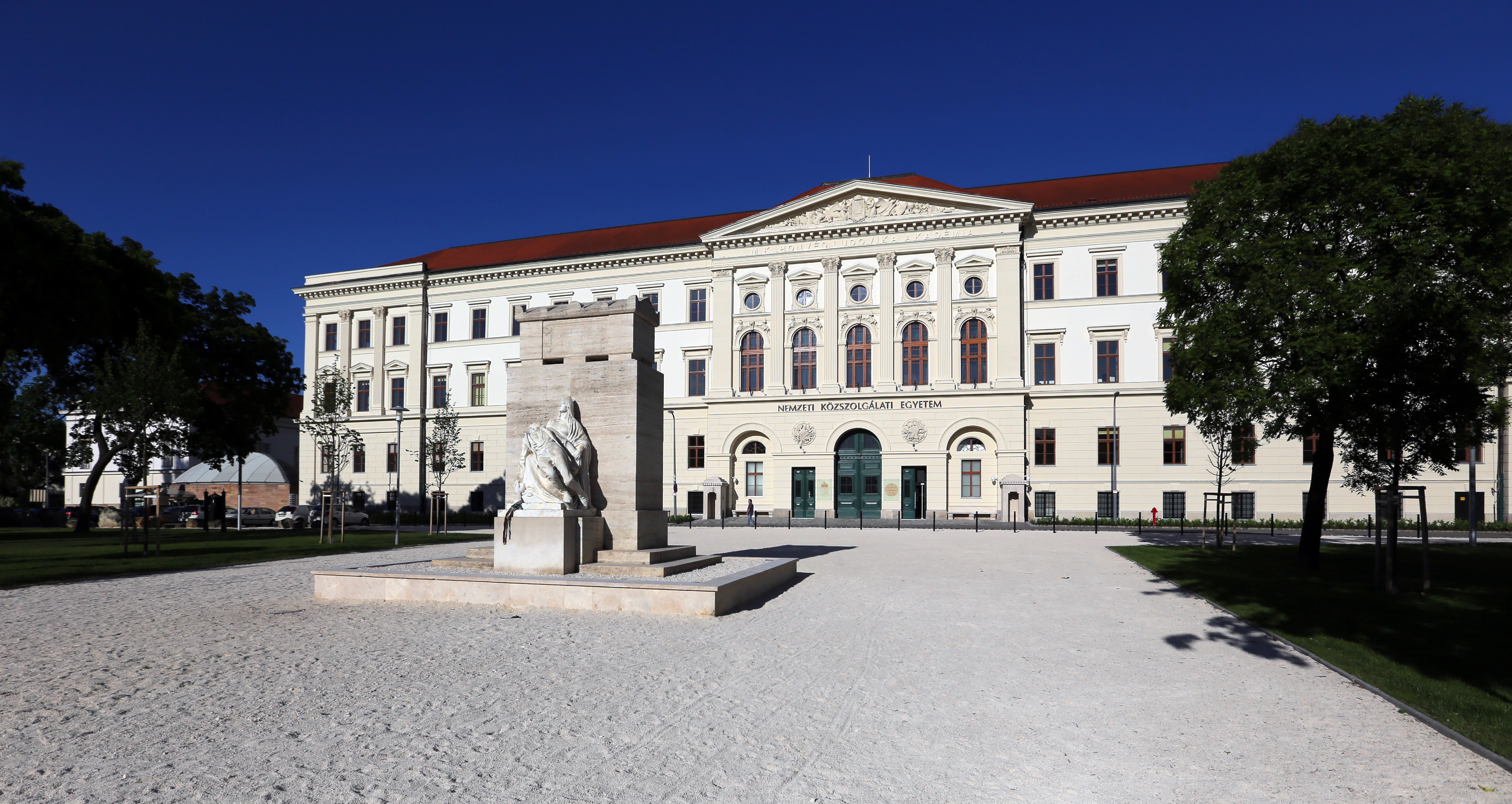
Ludovica Academy (1831–1836), Ludovika Campus, Budapest

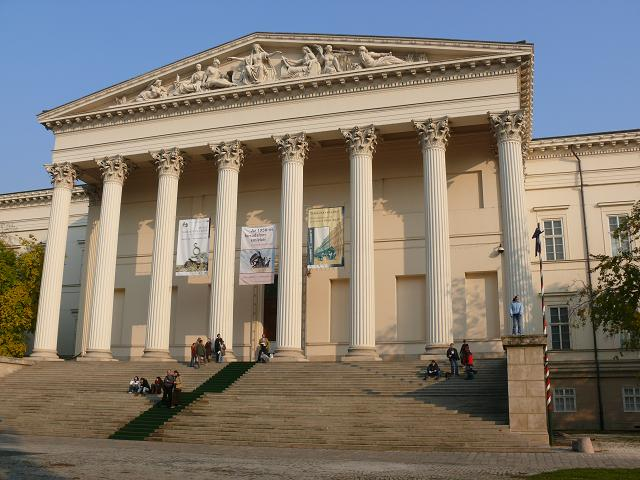
Hungarian National Museum (1837–46)

== See also ==
- Neoclassical architects
- Neoclassical architecture in Hungary
