= Sándor Palace =

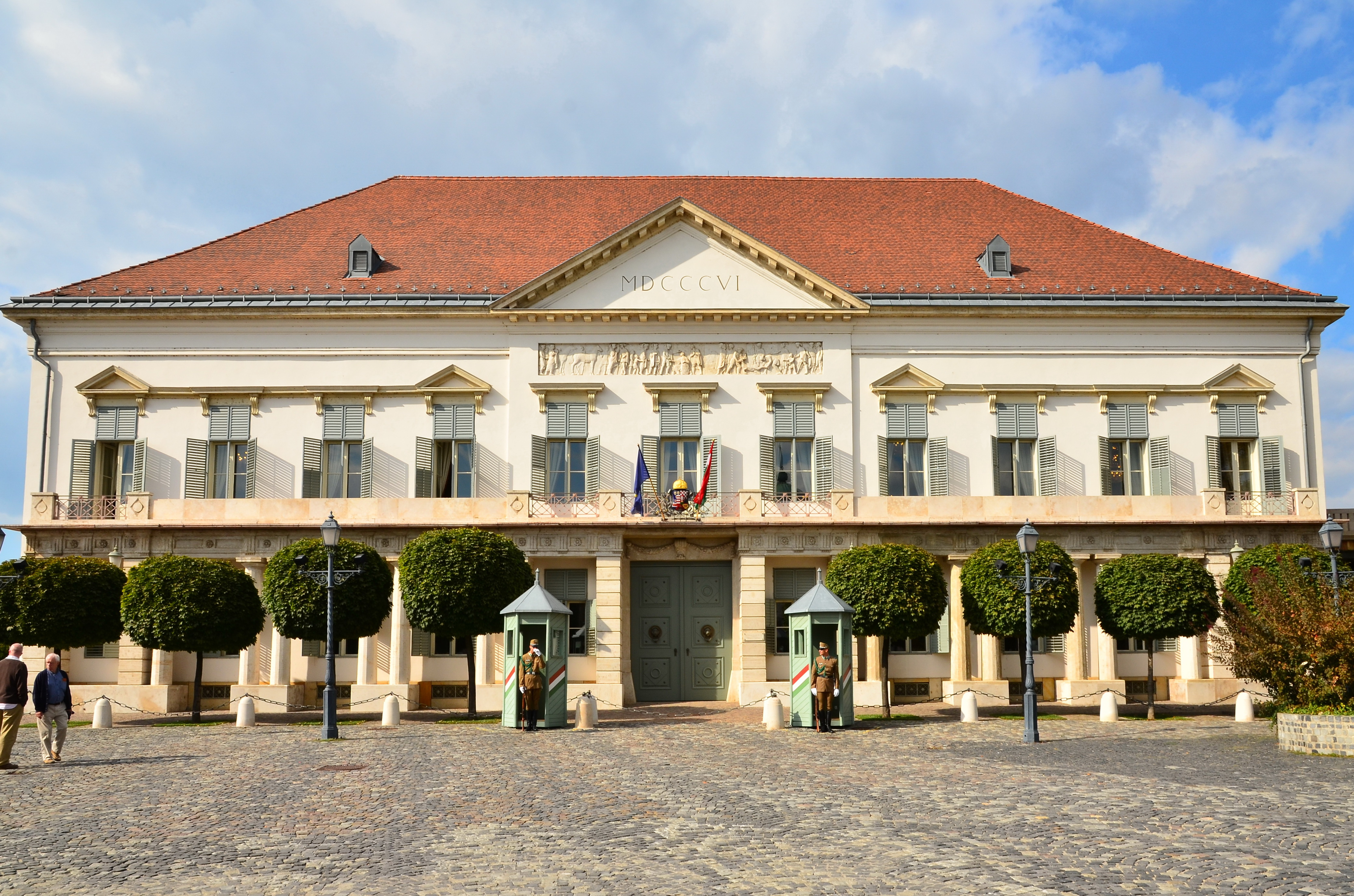
- Southeastern façade of the palace
- Interactive map of the Sándor Palace area

General information
- Architectural style: neoclassicism
- Location: Szent György tér Budapest, Hungary
- Coordinates: 47.4978°N 19.0378°E
- Construction started: around 1803

Design and construction
- Architects: Mihály Pollack and Johann Aman

Sándor Palace (Hungarian: Sándor-palota, pronounced [ˈʃaːndor ˈpɒlotɒ]) is a palace in Budapest, Hungary. Located beside the Buda Castle complex in the ancient Castle District, it has served as the official residence and workspace of the President of Hungary since 2003.

Sándor Palace is the 37th largest palace in present-day Hungary.

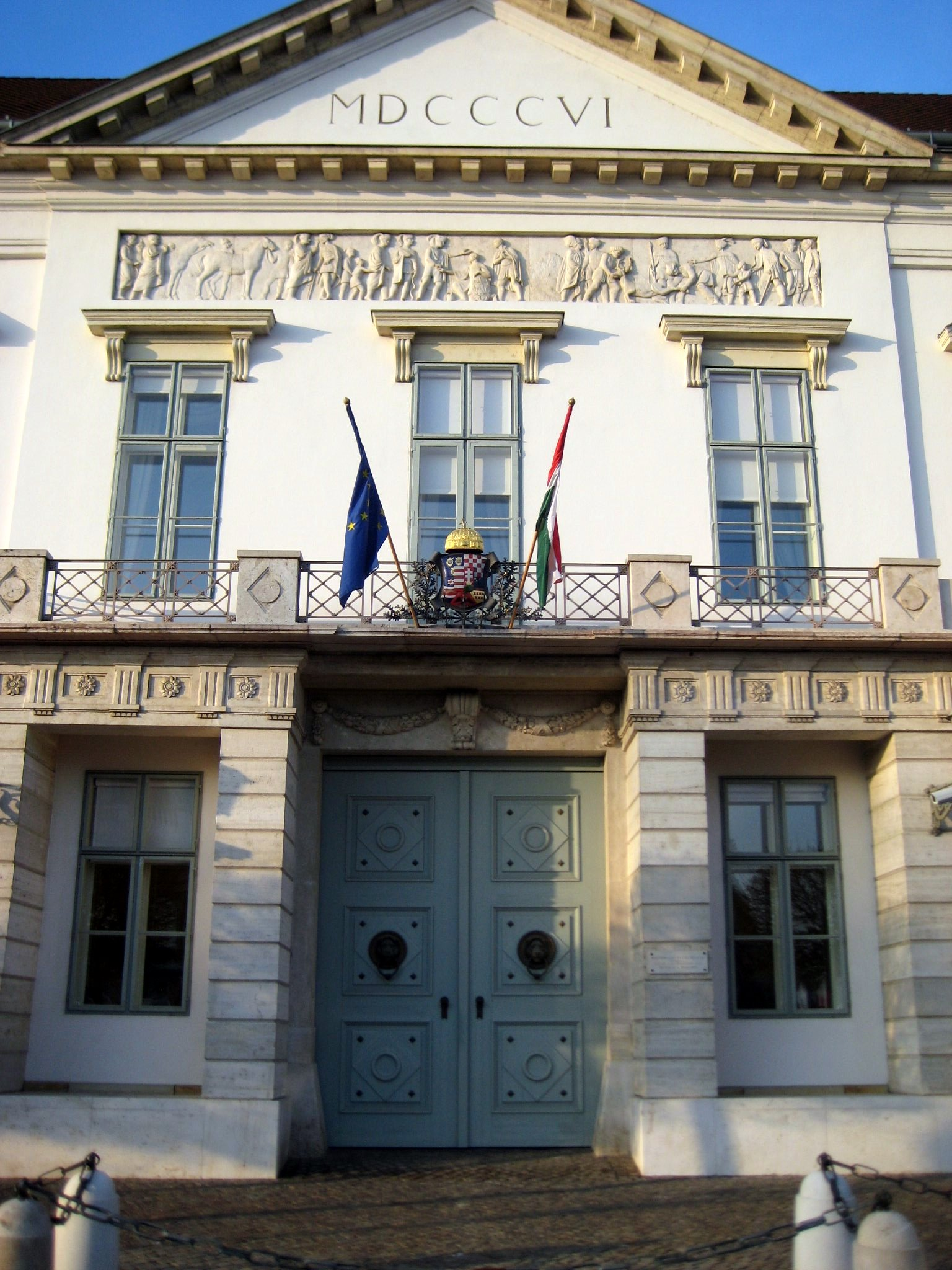
Neoclassical style facade details.

== History ==
=== 19th century ===
The original Neoclassical style palace was begun about 1803, and completed about 1806. Count Vincent Sándor commissioned it, and it was named after him. Count Vincent Sándor was a philosopher and aristocrat in the Austrian Empire. His son Count Móric Sándor de Szlavnicza (1805–1878) was better known in Budapest and Vienna, from fame for acrobatic jousts.

The palace then next belonged to Archduke Albrecht, the Imperial Governor of Hungary, until the failed Hungarian Revolution of 1848. After that the palace and its adjacent buildings facing the square were rented as government offices.

Prime ministers

The most prestigious tenant was the Hungarian Prime Minister Gyula Andrássy, who in 1867 leased it for the Hungarian government from the Pallavicini family. He would later obtain ownership of the palace following a property swap.

Andrassy renovated the building, which by then was badly in need of repair, with the help of the architect Miklós Ybl. He renovated the ground floor and used it as his offices, while the first floor became his residence.

In all, nineteen Hungarian prime ministers have lived in the palace, each adapting the building to their own tastes.

=== Destruction in World War II ===
After the fall of the Hungarian Soviet Republic in 1919, Sándor Palace continued as the Prime Minister's residence until World War II. In 1941, during the war, the grief-stricken Pál Teleki committed suicide in the palace.

Less than four years later, Allied aircraft bombed Sándor Palace, and the building was left in ruins. Anything in the palace that was of value was taken as war booty. Although the ruins did not fall victim to the bulldozer, the palace remained neglected until the Revolutions of 1989.

=== Restoration ===
Following the change from the Communist political system in Hungary in 1989, and thanks to a devoted team of restoration workers, a roof was erected over the ruins and the walls were supported. Over the years, Sándor Palace was gradually restored to its former glory, and the interior renovated in 2002. Most of the furnishings and objects are replicas of the originals that had been destroyed.

The restoration was conducted on the basis of the original blueprints, recovered in 1983, and the detailed history of contemporary maps.

== Architecture and design ==
=== Exterior features ===
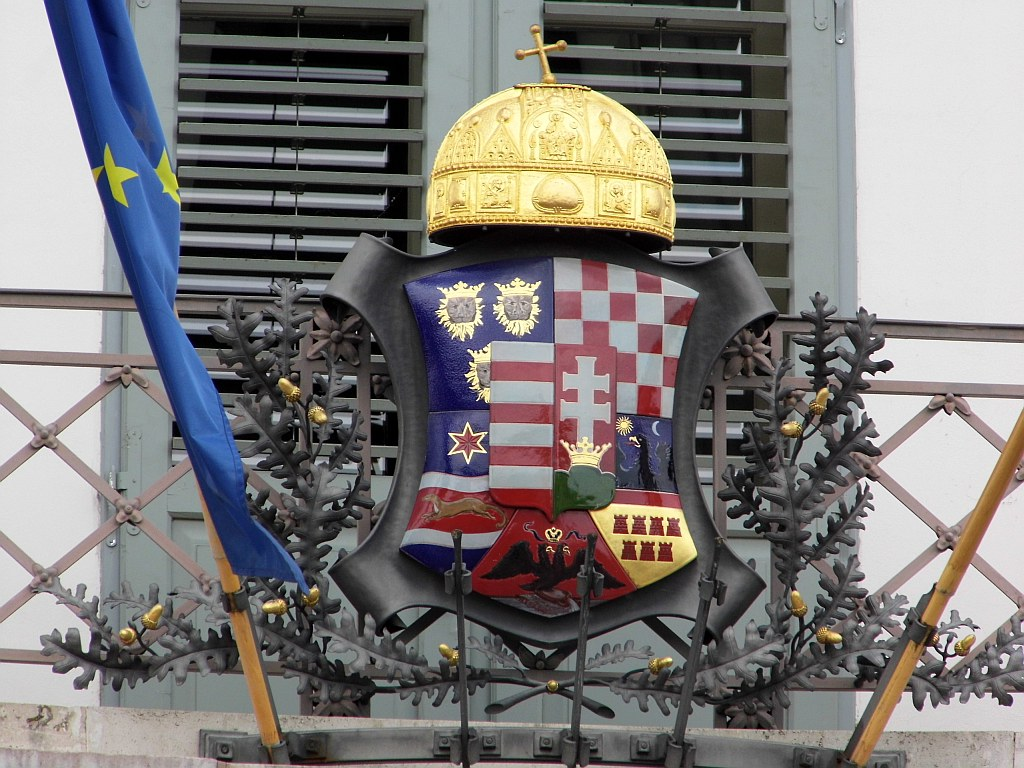
The former coat of arms of Hungary on the southeast side.

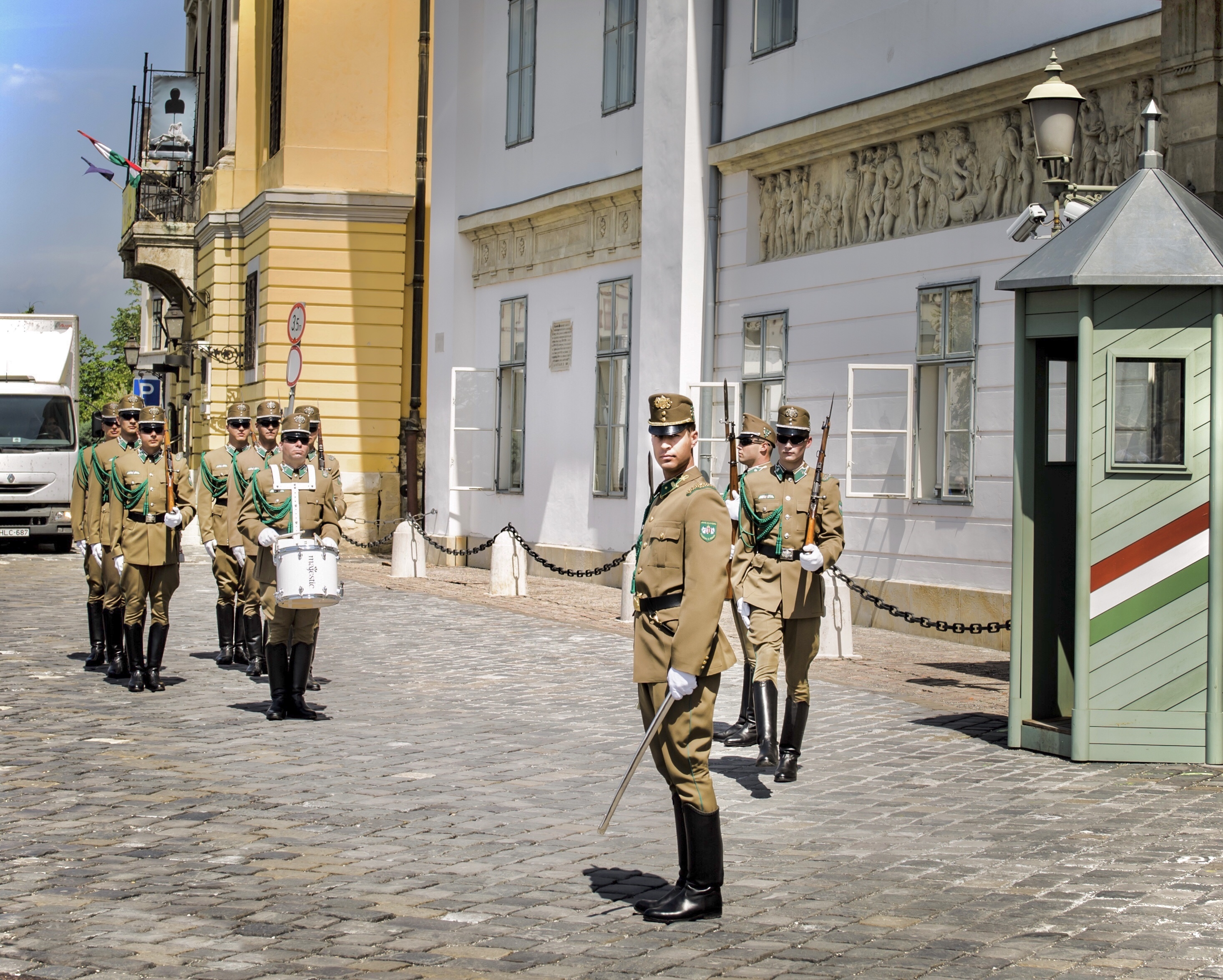
Sentries guarding southwest palace door

The southwest façade of the palace, which faces the square, features a pair of light green doors with the inscription Köztársasági Elnöki Hivatal (Hungarian: President of the Republic's Office) immediately above. On the iron balustrade above the inscription, is the modern coat of arms of Hungary, flanked by the Hungarian and European Union flags.

The southeast façade of the palace has a similar pair of light green doors with no inscription. On the iron balustrade above these doors, the Hungarian and EU flags appear alongside the former Hungarian coat of arms, which depict Hungary quartered with Dalmatia, Croatia, Slavonia, Fiume and Transylvania. Above the first floor on the southeast side is a tympanum, in imitation of Graeco-Roman architecture, with the Roman numeral MDCCCVI (1806, the year of the completion of the original palace).

=== Interior features ===
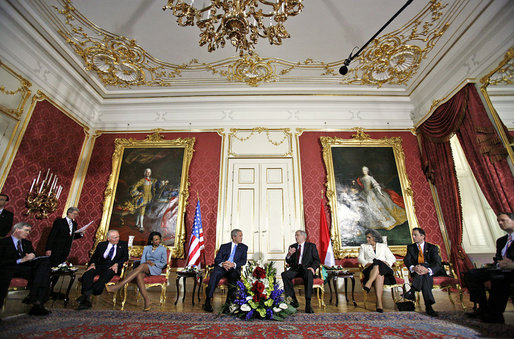
President George W. Bush meets with Hungarian President László Sólyom at Maria Theresa Salon

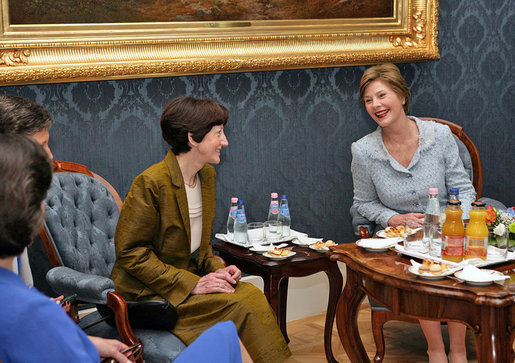
First Lady Laura Bush attends a tea hosted by Hungarian First Lady Erzsébet Sólyom at The Blue Salon

Visitors can enter the building via the southern main gate and the main staircase. The staircase has a mellow glistening surface and elegant gold-plated cast iron railings.

The entrance lobby is decorated with simple striped damask tapestries, and the walls are lined with Biedermeier chairs, in accordance with function.

The Round Salon houses an identical replica of the original floor designed in 1928 by Rezső Hikisch. The walls are white and the ceiling is adorned with murals. The objects and the statues in the niches all replicate those originally housed in the palace.

The Small Empire Salon once linked the private and public parts of the palace. Today the president uses this room for informal meetings. A recently discovered series of panels featuring mythological figures by Károly Lotz line the walls as a frieze, and an octagonal picture of a goddess was added to the ceiling.

The Blue Salon, or Gobelin Hall, is the most exquisite room in the palace with its baroque-style furniture and is used for larger meetings.

The Red Salon, or Maria Theresa Salon, is the most elegant room in the palace. It previously featured a portrait of Empress Maria Theresa, which is lost. Its place is now occupied by a portrait of the Empress dressed for her coronation as Queen of Hungary. The murals in the room were designed by Miklós Ybl. The room was especially tailored in memory of the Reconciliation between the monarch and the government; thus, it contains no portraits of Hungarian presidents or prime ministers, which are prominent in other rooms.

The lavish Hall of Mirrors is used by the president for very formal events, such as the reception of ambassadors.

The President's Conference Room is located in the southwest corner of the palace. It has views overlooking the Danube and Buda Castle and was entirely reconstructed in the 1990s after the original room was destroyed.

The President's Study, based on a 1920s design, was originally the Ministers' Waiting Room. Portraits of former prime ministers line the walls.

The Tea Salon overlooks the central courtyard and portraits of the jouster Móric Sándor line the walls.

The Knights' Hall, in the northeast corner of the palace, was formerly used as the stables. The red stone horse troughs still survive. The room was later used for press conferences, and is still sometimes used for this purpose today.

== Public access ==
The palace is occasionally open to the public at weekends during the summer months, and sometimes hosts exhibitions about the Hungarian political system.
