= Hungarian National Museum =

Museum in Budapest, Hungary

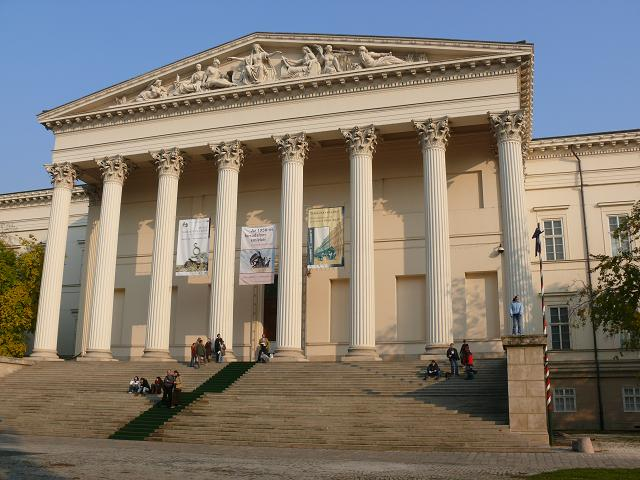
- Museum building in 2006
- Established: 1802
- Location: Józsefváros, Budapest, Hungary
- Coordinates: 47.49111°N 19.06278°E
- Website: mnm.hu/en

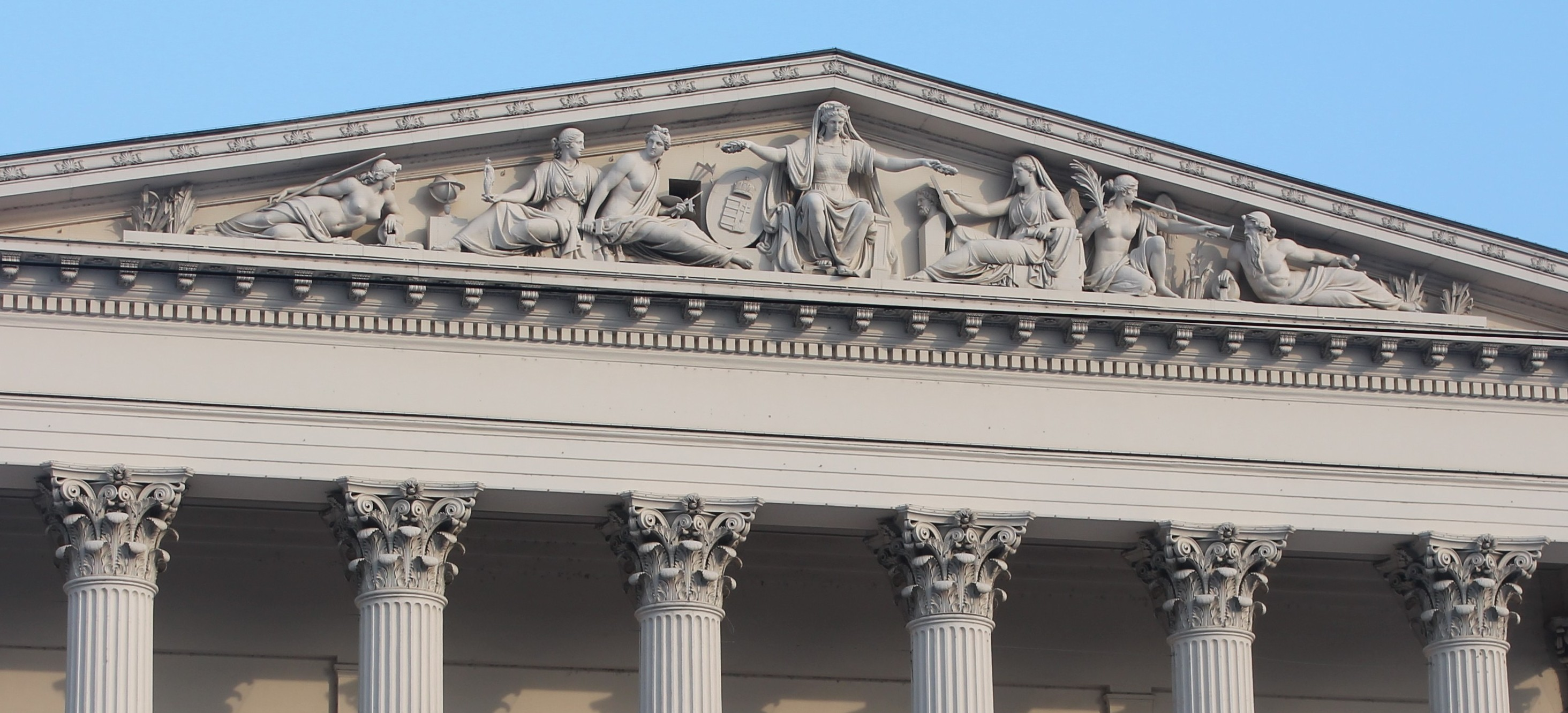
Budapest, Hungarian National Museum

The Hungarian National Museum (Hungarian: Magyar Nemzeti Múzeum, pronounced [ˈmɒɟɒr ˈnɛmzɛti ˈmuːzɛum]) was founded in 1802 and is the national museum for the history, art, and archaeology of Hungary, including areas not within Hungary's modern borders, such as Transylvania; it is separate to the collection of international art in the Hungarian National Gallery. The museum is in Budapest VIII in a Neoclassical building, purpose-built during 1837–47 by the architect Mihály Pollack.

== History ==
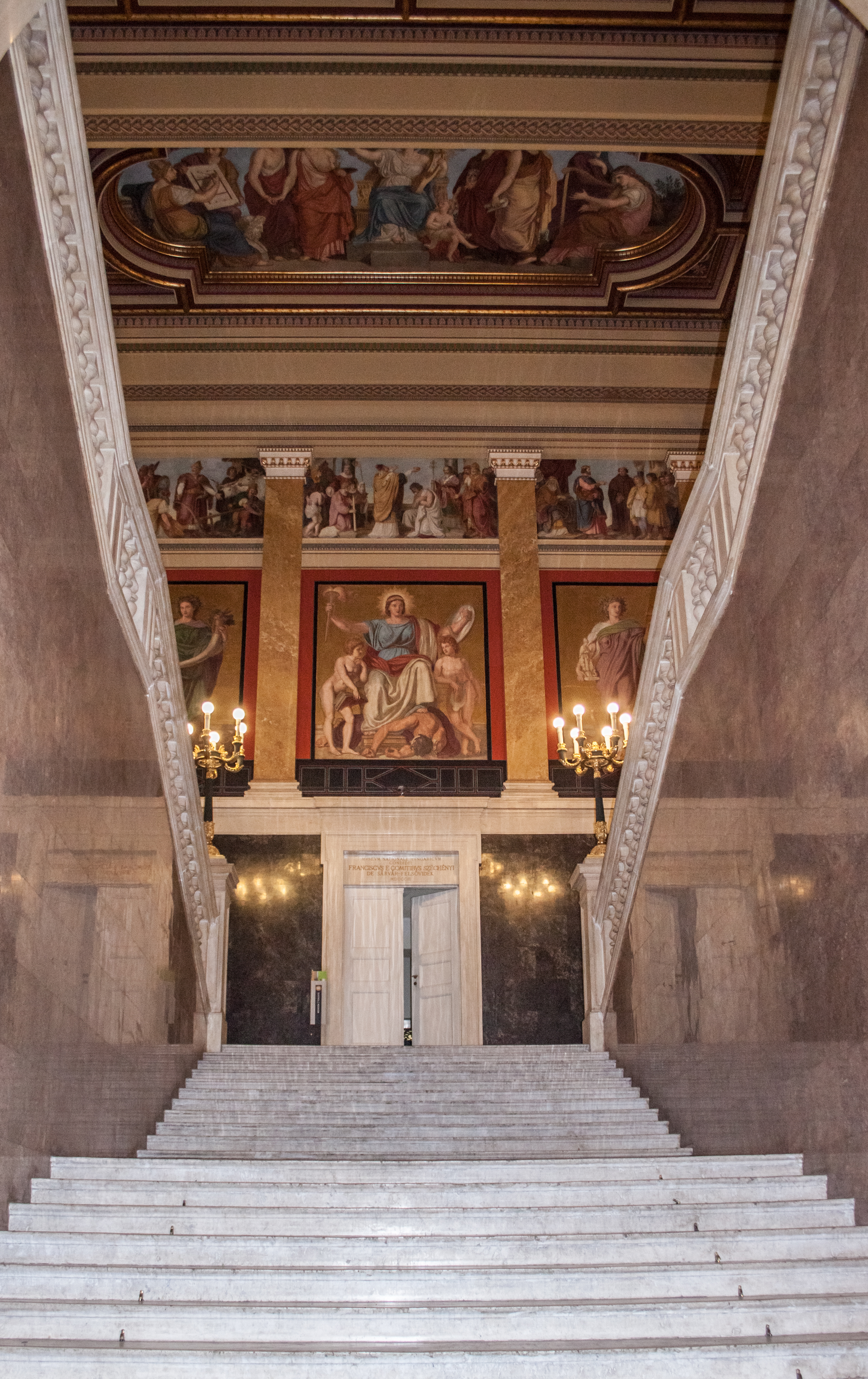
The main stairway

The Hungarian National Museum traces its foundation to 1802, when Count Ferenc Széchényi set up the National Széchényi Library. This would then be followed a year later by the donating of a mineral collection by Széchényi's wife. This led to the creation of the Hungarian National Museum as a general history and natural history museum, beyond being simply a library. In 1807, the Hungarian National Parliament passed legislation on the new institution and asked the nation to help donate to the museum.

The Hungarian Parliament of 1832–1834 helped with the growth of the museum as well. The parliament voted in favor of giving half a million forints to help with the construction of a new building for the museum. During this time the Hungarian National History Museum was officially set up under the Hungarian National Museum. Later, in 1846, the museum moved to its current location of VIII. Múzeum krt. 14–16, where the museum resides in a neo-classical style building designed by Mihály Pollack.

In 1848, the Hungarian National Museum played a major role in the Hungarian Revolution. The Revolution was partially spurred by the reading of Sándor Petőfi's 12 points and the famous poem Nemzeti dal on the front steps of the museum. This helped make the museum a major site of national importance and identity for Hungary. It was also here that Ágoston Kubinyi, the first director of the National Museum, protected the original manuscript of Nemzeti dal during the subsequent War of Independence. In remembrance of the revolution, two statues were added to the museum: the first is a statue of János Arany, unveiled in 1883. In 1890, there was a statue next to the stairs of the museum of a memorial tablet to Sándor Petőfi. Additionally, during this time, the Upper House of the parliament held its sessions in the Cereminial of the museum. This continued until the new house of Parliament was built. Today, festivities held in remembrance of the National Commemorations Day of 1848 are held in front of the museum.

In 1949, an act split the ethnographic and natural history part of the Hungarian National Museum off of the main museum. They now comprise the Hungarian Natural History Museum and Ethnographic Museum. This also helped with the setting up of the modern day National Széchényi Library. All of these separate museums are still interconnected, and other museums and monuments have become affiliated with them over time. The most recent addition was the Castle Museum in Esztergom, which joined in 1985.

== Exhibitions ==
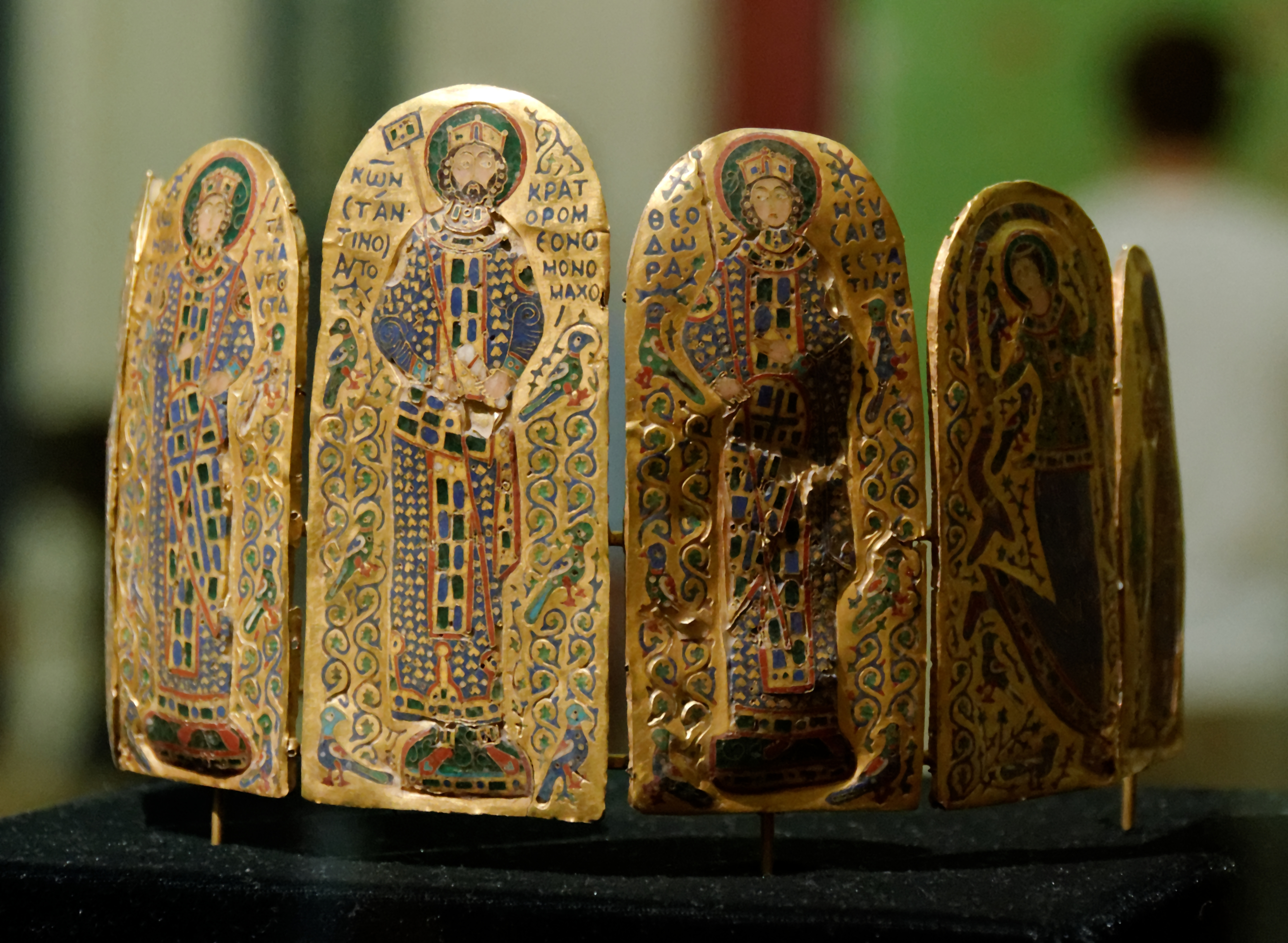
The Byzantine enamel plaques of the 11th century Monomachus Crown showing Constantine IX Monomachus and Empress Zoe; one of the internationally famous objects in the collection

The Hungarian National Museum has seven permanent displays. The general history of Hungary is covered in two sections: the archaeology from prehistory to the Avar period ending in 804 AD on the first (ground) floor ("On the East-West frontier"), and the history from 804 to modern times on the first floor. This display covers topics such as the age of the Arpads, the long Turkish occupation, Transylvania and royal Hungary. More modern and Contemporary history covered begins with the Rákóczi War of Independence, showing different sections of his military attire and various coins. The history section then ends with the rise and fall of the communist system in Hungary. In another hall on the second floor one can find out about the Scholar Hungarians who made the twentieth century. A room on the first floor displays the medieval Hungarian Coronation Mantle.

The ground floor's permanent exhibit is focused on Medieval and Early Modern stone inscriptions and carvings. This exhibit looks at various stone relics and the carvings that have been made into them. The majority of the items in this collection were discovered during the 1960s and 1970s, since they looked for more relics post World War II. The final permanent exhibit is placed in the basement of the museum. This is the Roman Lapidary exhibit, which is a collection of ancient Roman stone inscriptions and carvings.

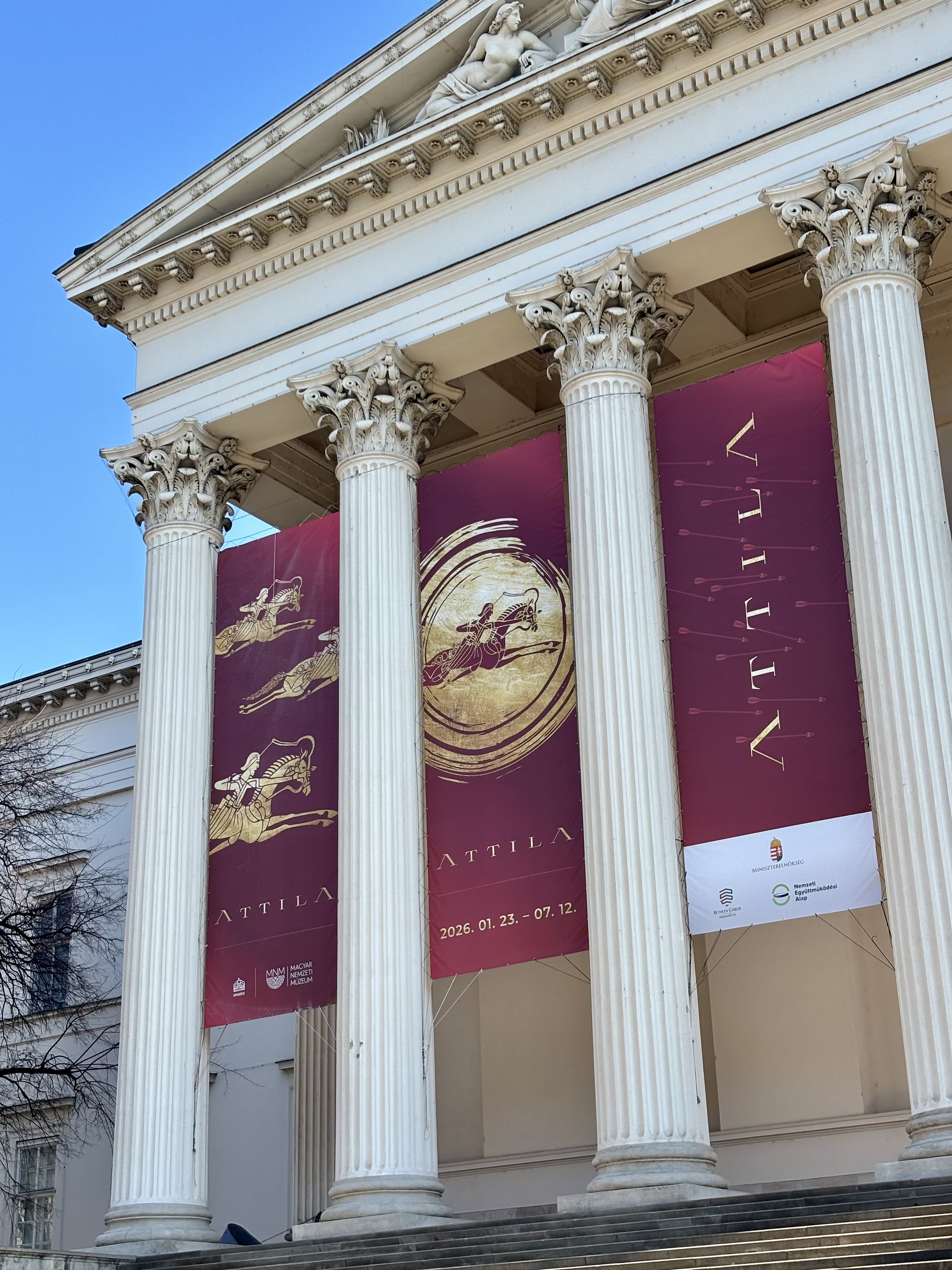
Attila exhibition, 2026

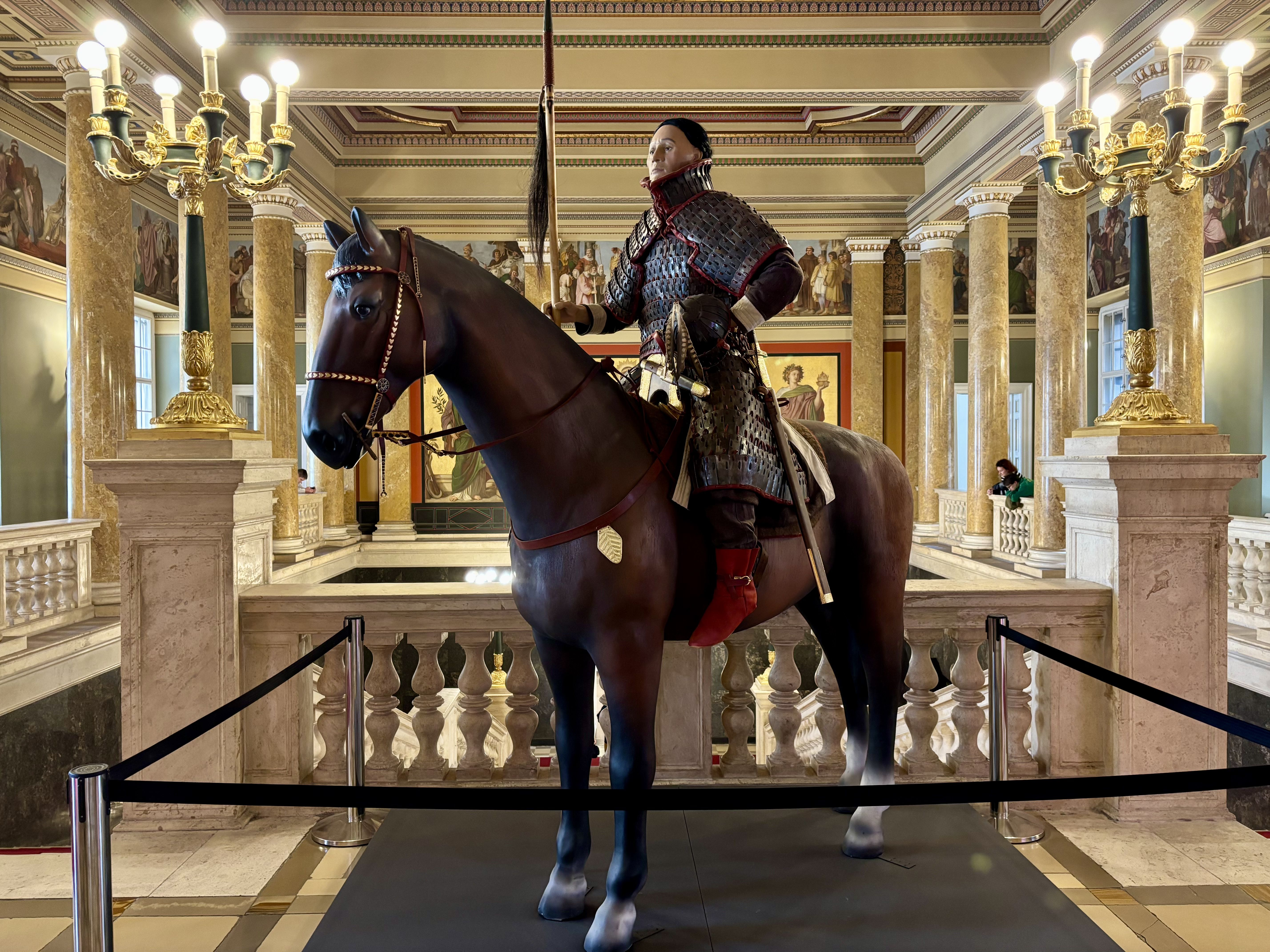
A reconstructed Hun warrior (Attila exhibition, 2026)

== Building ==
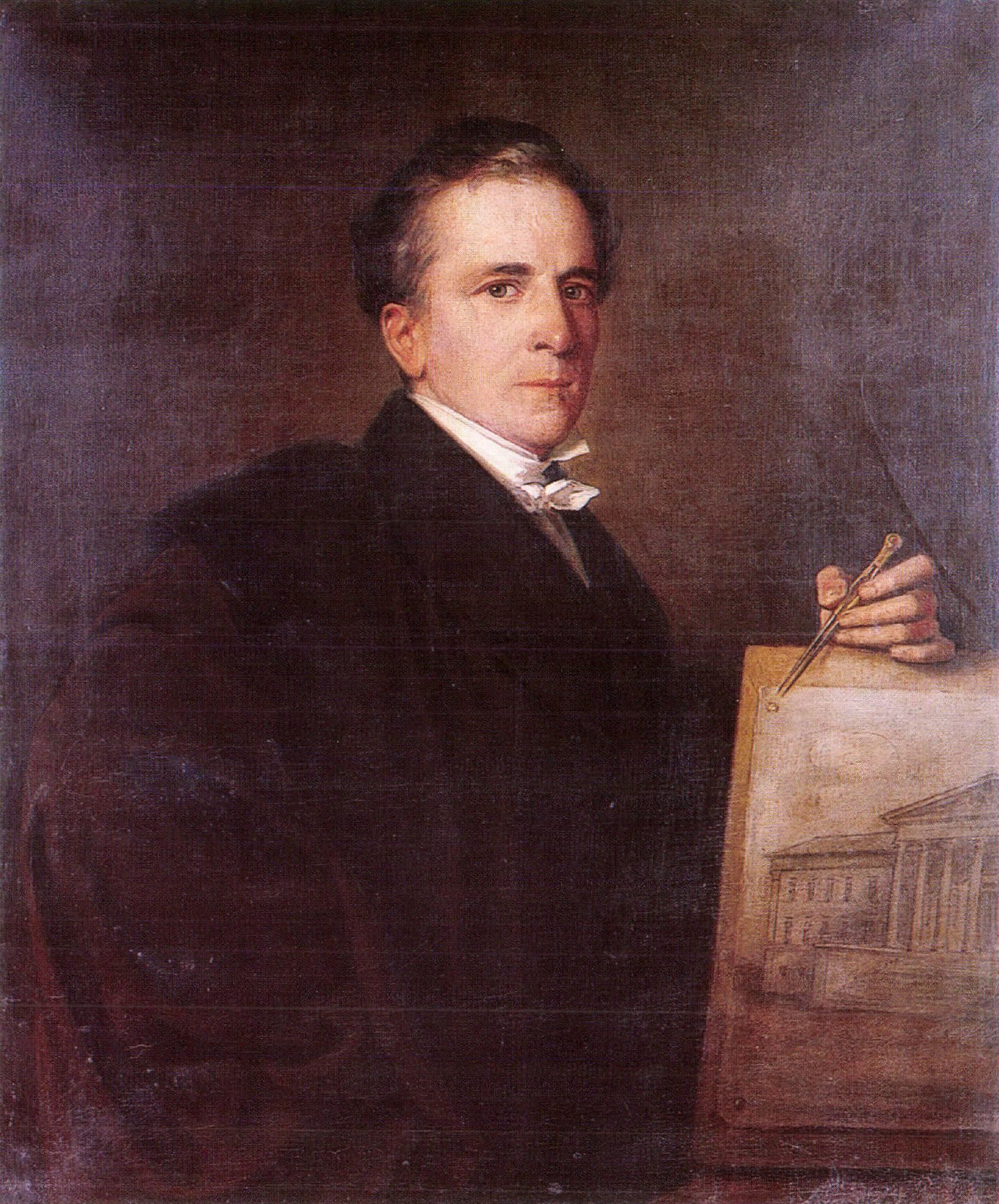
The architect, Mihály Pollack (1773–1855), with the elevation of the Museum

The building where the Hungarian National Museum is currently located was built from 1837 to 1847. The style of the main building was laid out in a neo-classical style and was added onto by other artists in the form of statues, paintings and other architecture. The statues of the Portico were done by Raffael Monti of Milan. One of these is a famous statue of the allegoric figure of Hungary, holding a shield with the Hungarian coat of arms on it. On the sides of this figure there is Science on one and Art on the other. In addition the paintings that have been in the staircase and on the ceiling since 1875 were done by Károly Lotz and Mór Than. There has also been a garden that is used primarily for various concerts. Various artists have performed here including Ferenc Liszt. Today the garden is the venue of the Museum Festival.

Scenes from the movie Evita, starring Madonna were filmed on the steps leading in. The scenes depicted the coffin of Eva Peron being carried into a 'Buenos Aires' government building to lay in State.

== Departments ==
- Semmelweis Museum of Medical History (since 2017)

== Controversies ==
On 28 October 2023, the Hungarian ministry of culture and innovation ordered the museum to prevent minors from viewing the annual World Press Photo exhibition it was hosting as part of its child protection law against "sexual propaganda". The exhibition, which included five photographs of elderly members of the LGBTQ+ community in the Philippines taken by Hannah Reyes Morales, was the subject of a complaint by MP Dora Duro from the far-right Our Homeland Movement. World Press Photo executive director Joumana El Zein Khoury expressed surprise over the decision, and said there was "nothing explicit or offensive in these images". In response, the museum said it "cannot legally enforce" the order as it cannot ask for identity cards. It later issued a notice on its website and at the entrance to the exhibition that the collection was restricted to visitors over 18.

On 6 November, culture minister János Csák dismissed the museum's director, Laszlo Simon, who had assumed the position for a five-year term in 2021, citing his failure to comply with the said law and "engaging in conduct which made it impossible for him to continue his employment". In response, Simon wrote that he took "note of the decision" but could not "accept it", adding that he firmly rejected "the idea that our children should be protected from me or from the institution I run."

== Gallery ==
=== Archaeological collection ===
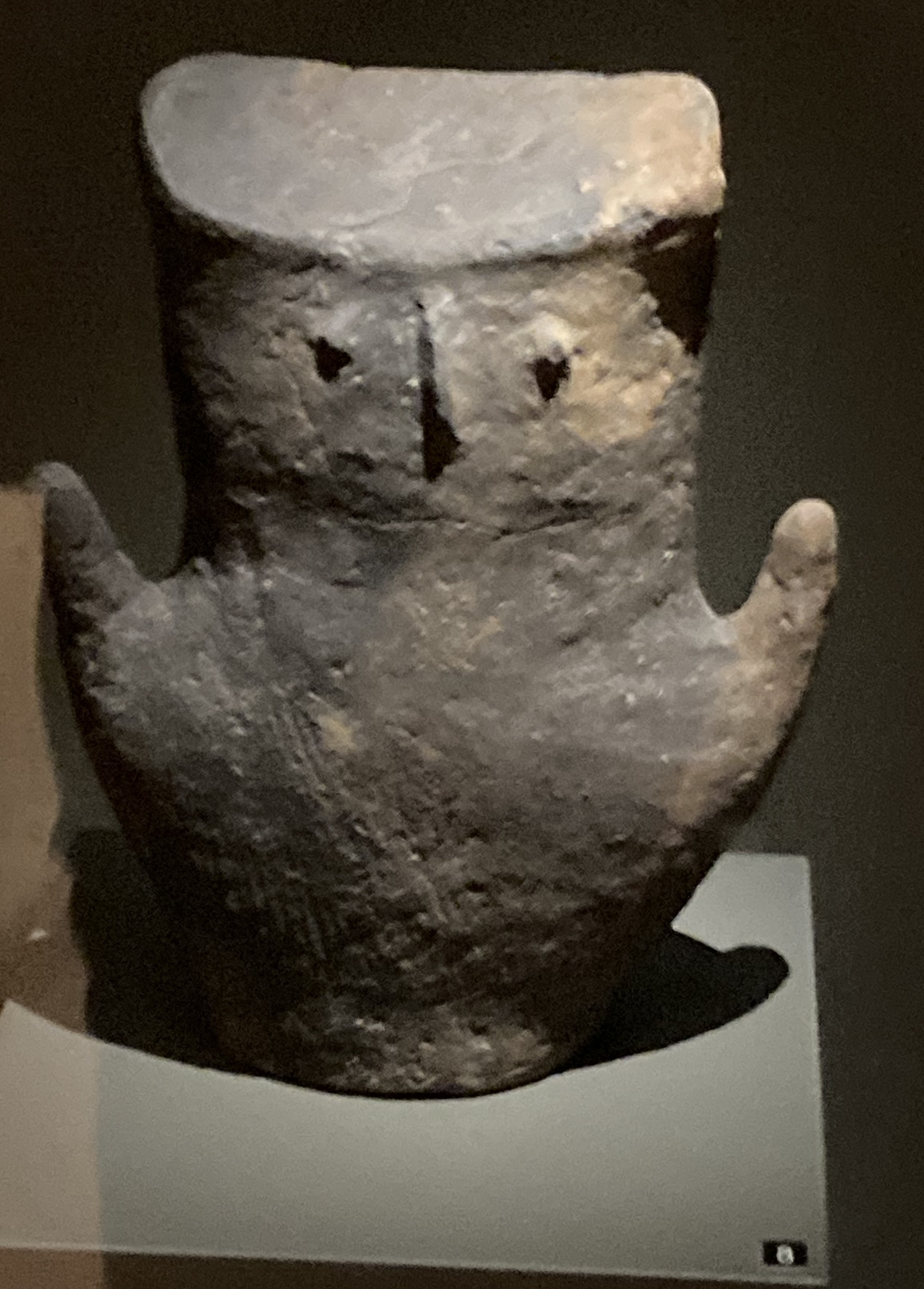
Neolithic female figure

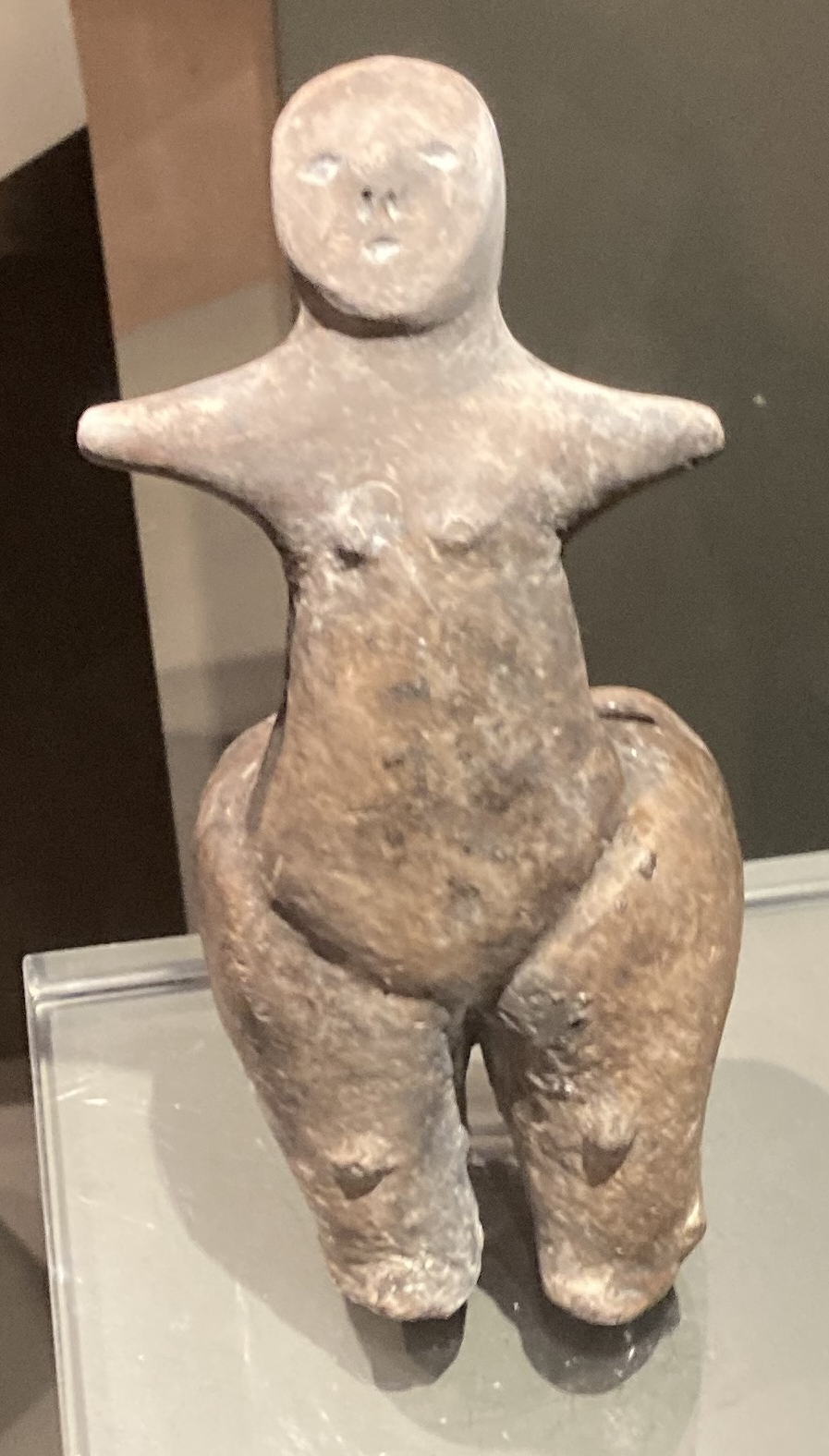
Neolithic female figure

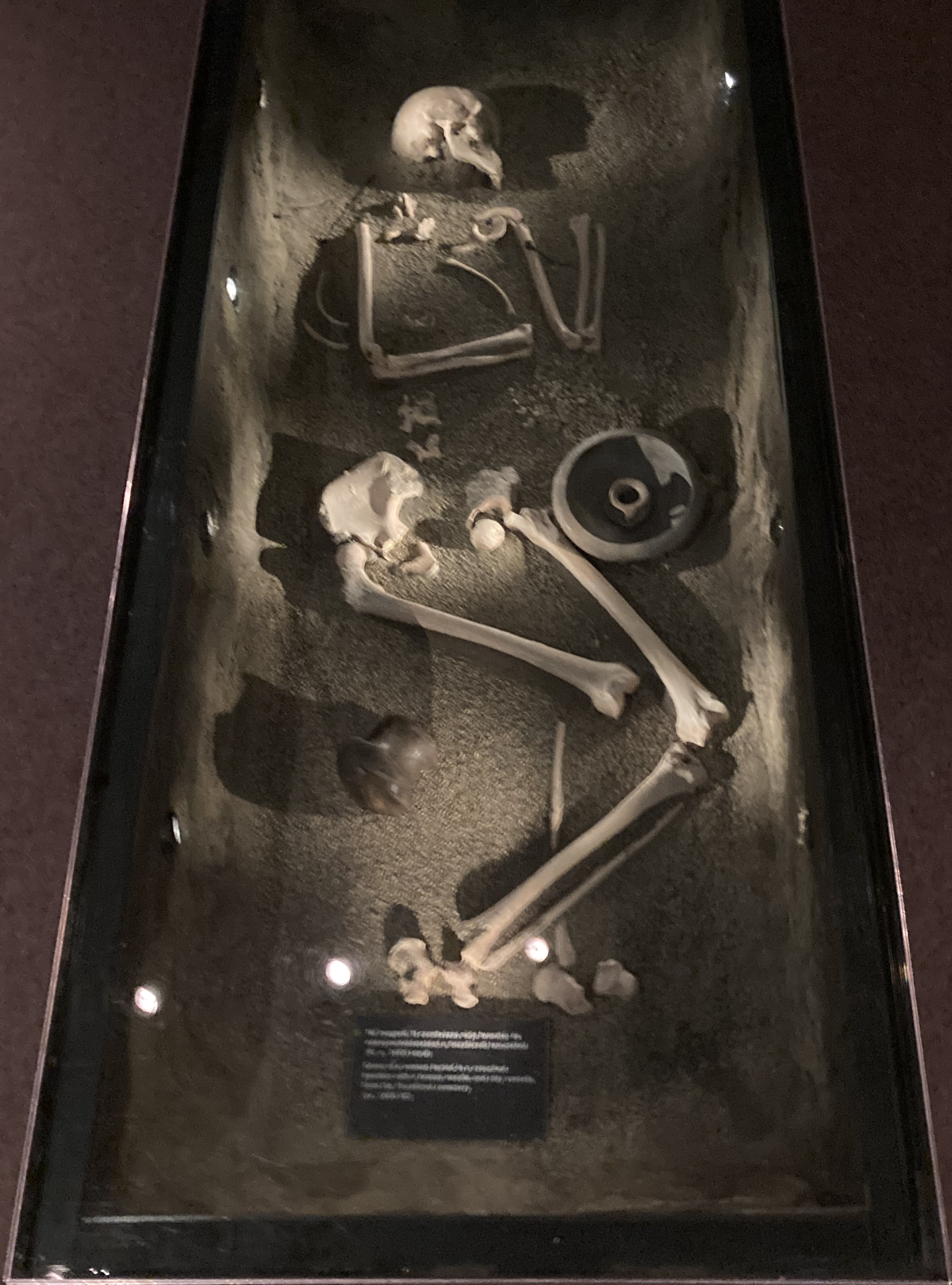
Bronze Age (?) skeleton

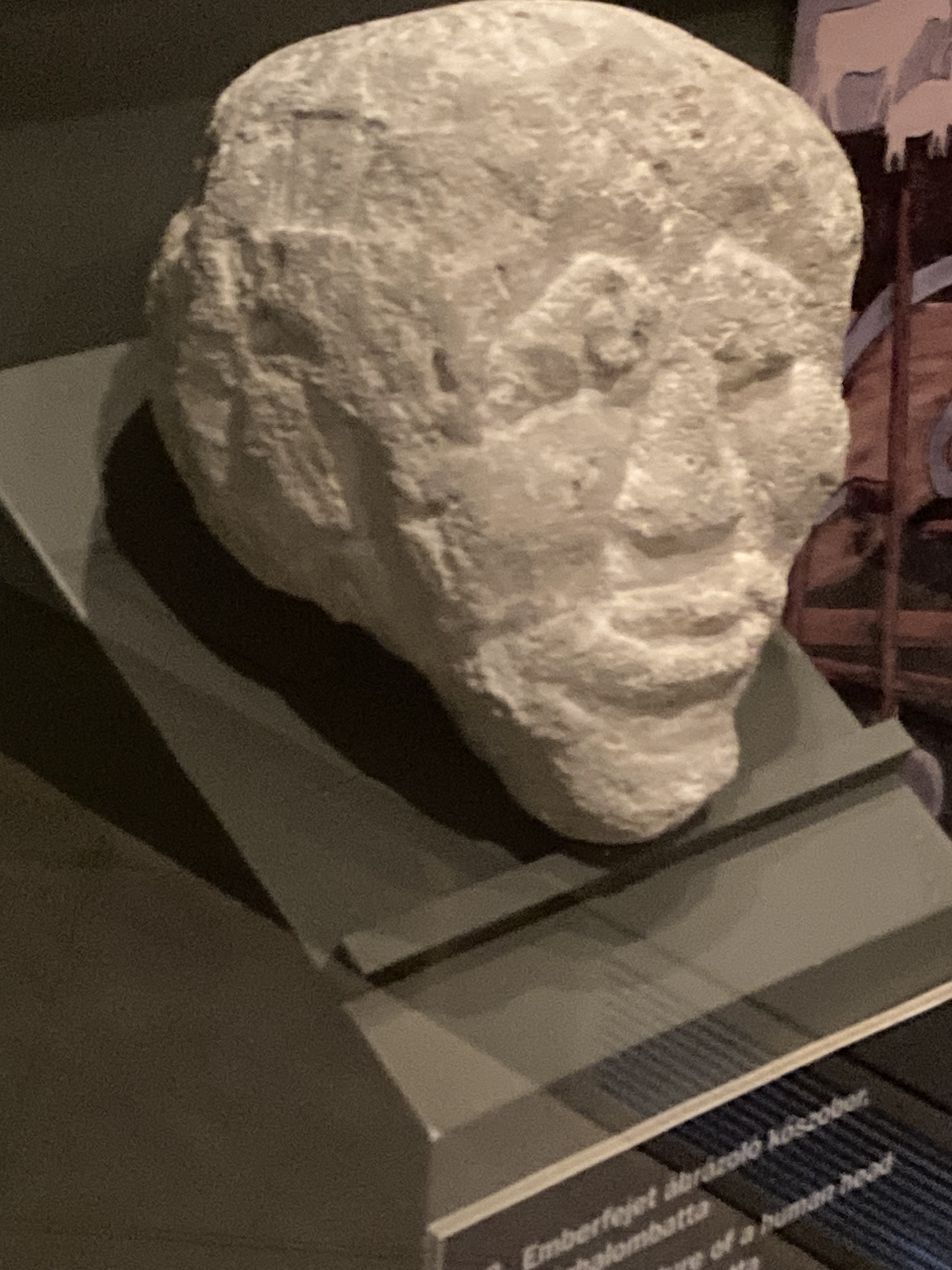
Iron Age stone head / idol

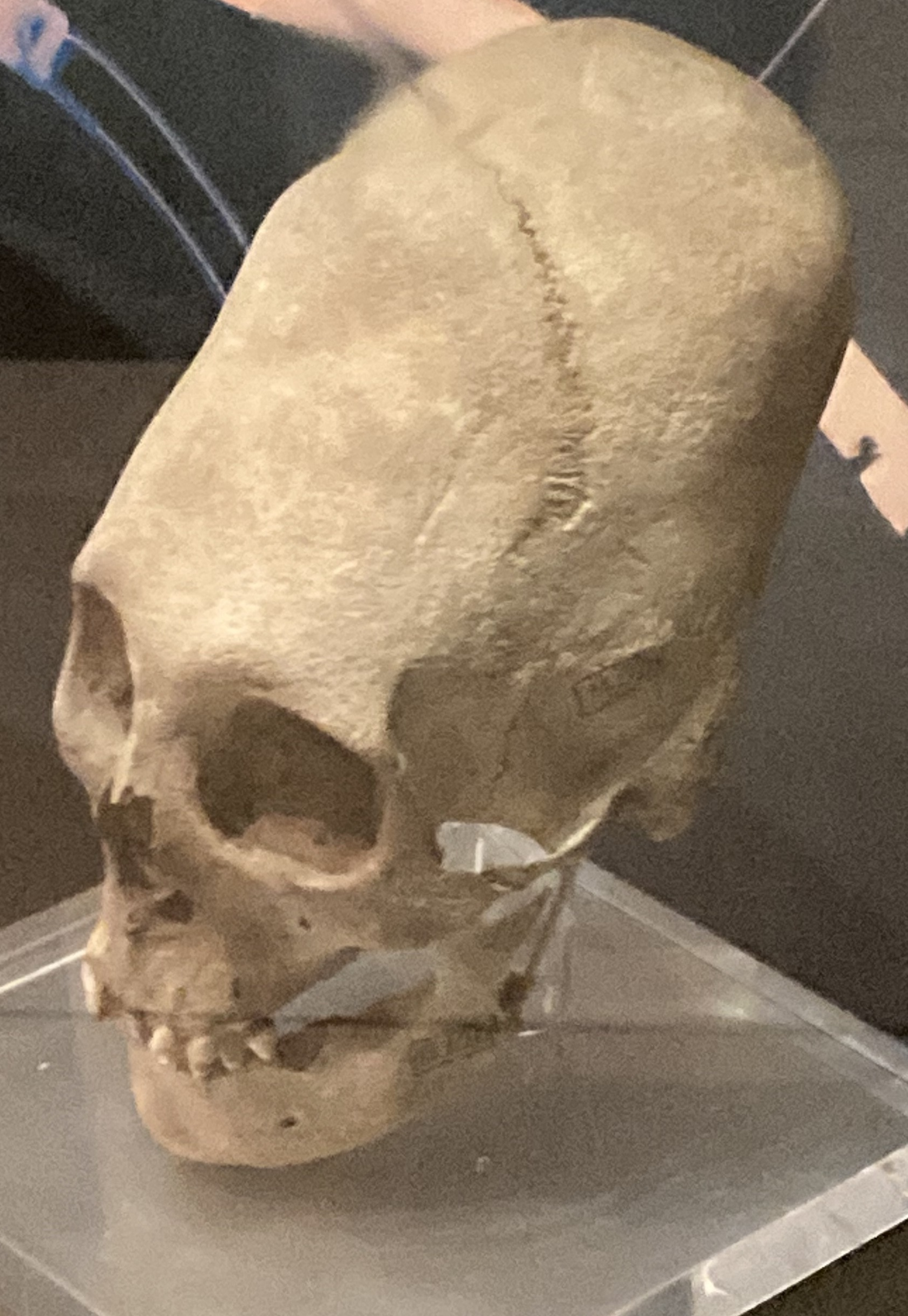
Elongated skull, female, post-Roman period

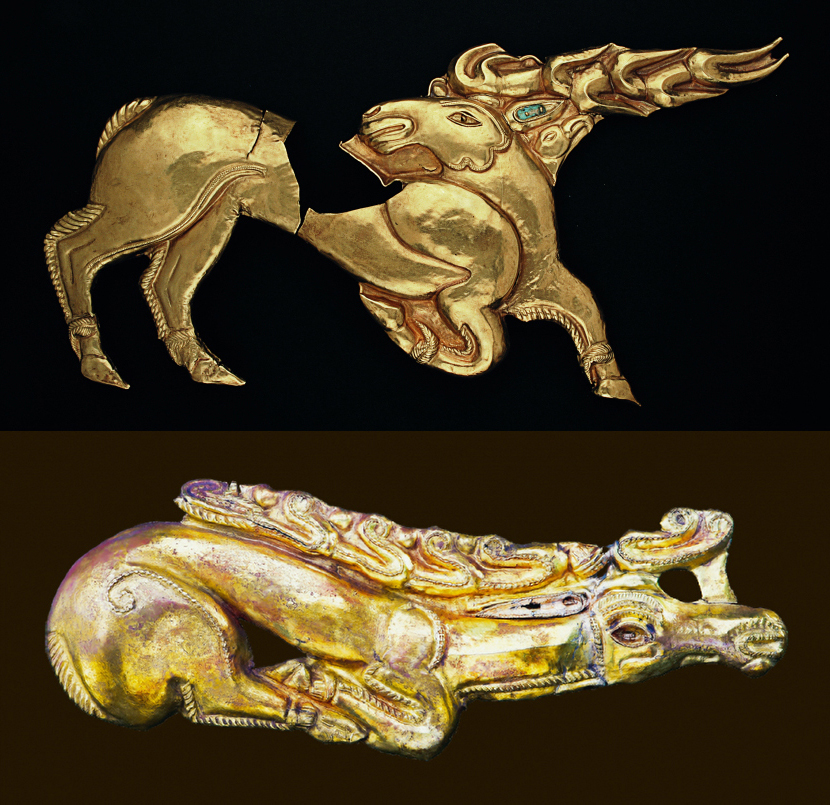
Scythian golden deer shield ornaments from the Iron Age 6th century BC found in Hungary. Above, the Golden Deer of Zöldhalompuszta is 37 cm, making it the largest Scythian golden deer known. Below, the Golden Deer of Tapiószentmárton.

=== Medieval collection ===
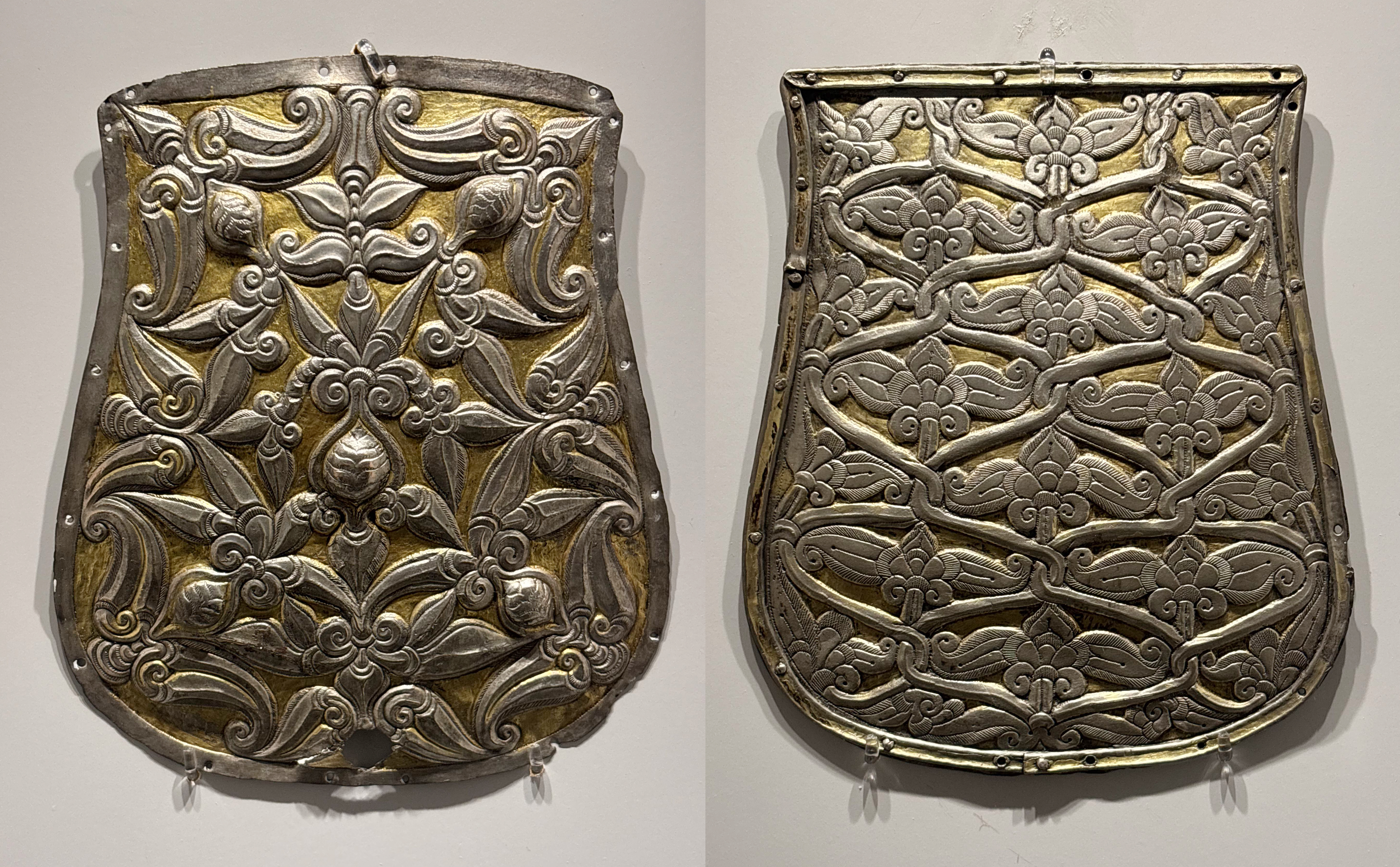
Hungarian sabretache plates from the Hungarian conquest period (10th-century)

Hungarian hair braid discs from the Hungarian conquest period (10th-century)

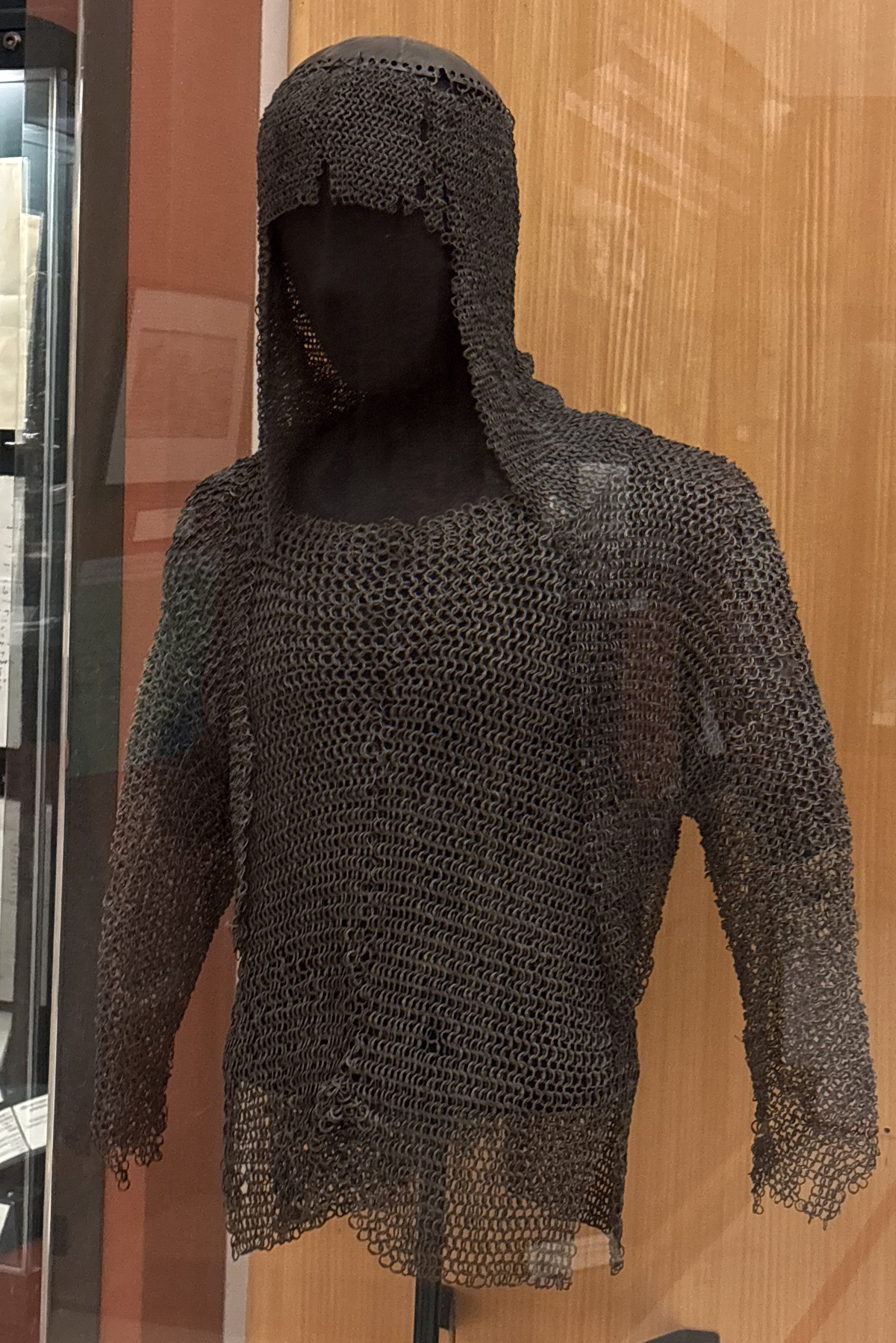
Chainmail shirt and mail coif of the Hungarian military commander Pál Kinizsi, he was a general of the Black Army of the Kingdom of Hungary during the reign of King Mathias Corvinus (second half of 15th century)

=== Portraits ===
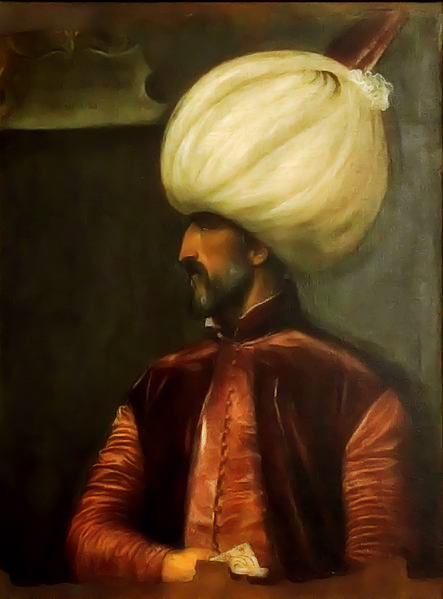
Portrait of Suleiman the Magnificent (1494–1566)

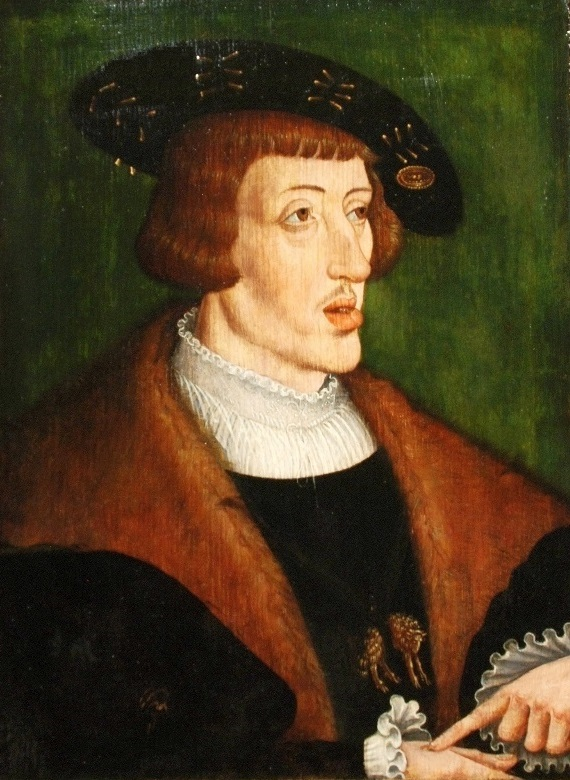
Portrait of Ferdinand I, Holy Roman Emperor, c. 1530

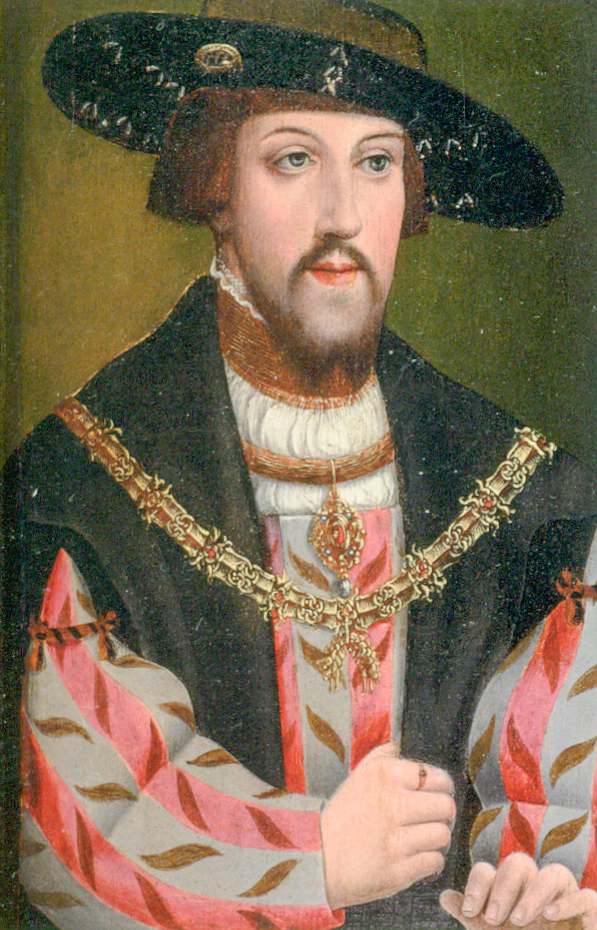
Louis II of Hungary, 16th century

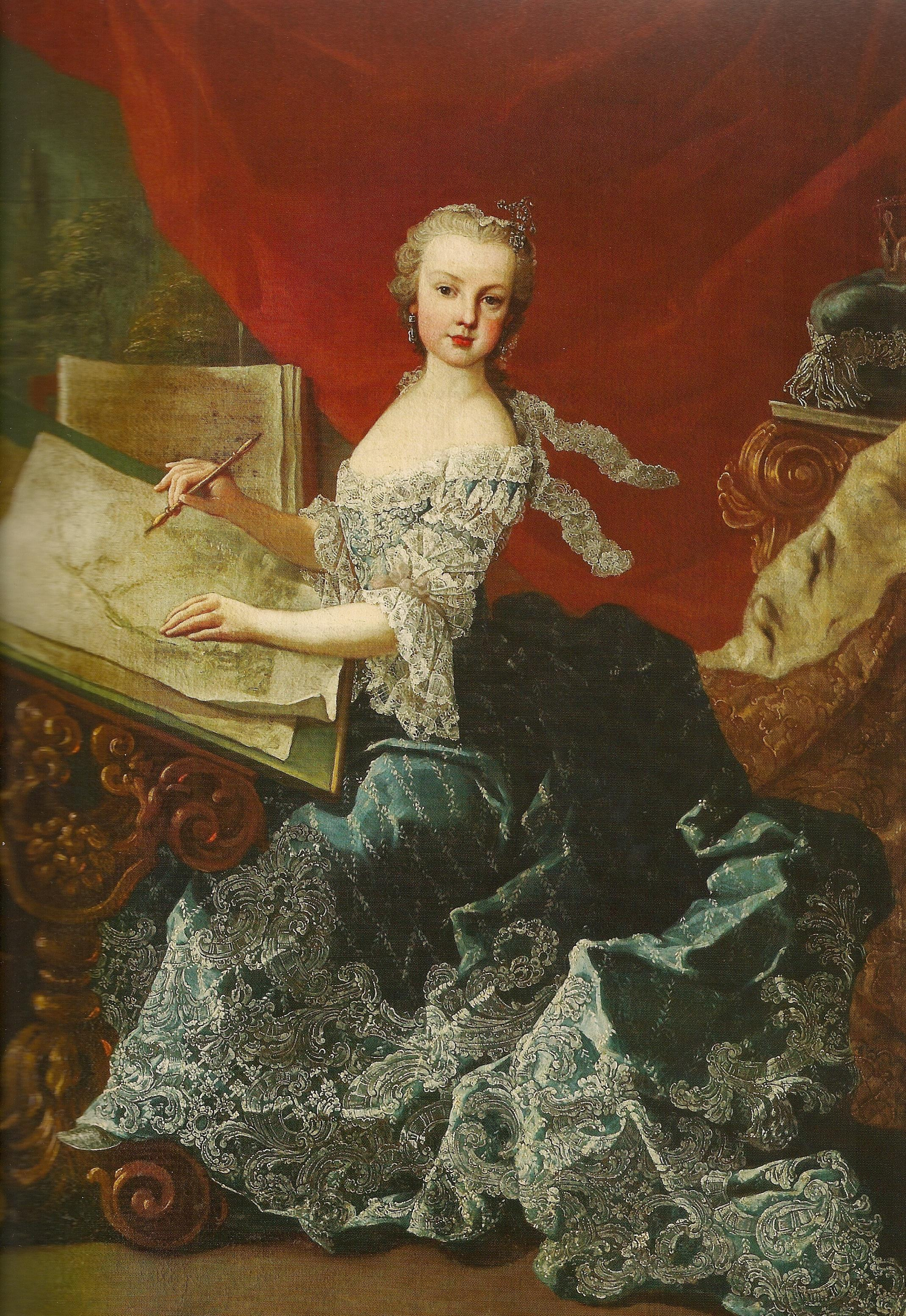
Maria Christina, Duchess of Teschen, Martin van Meytens, 1750

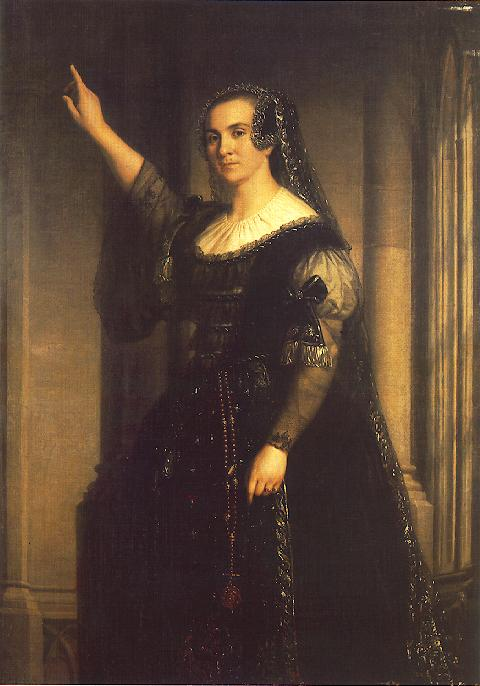
Mrs. Schodel in the Role of Elisabeth Szilágyi, Miklós Barabás, 1852

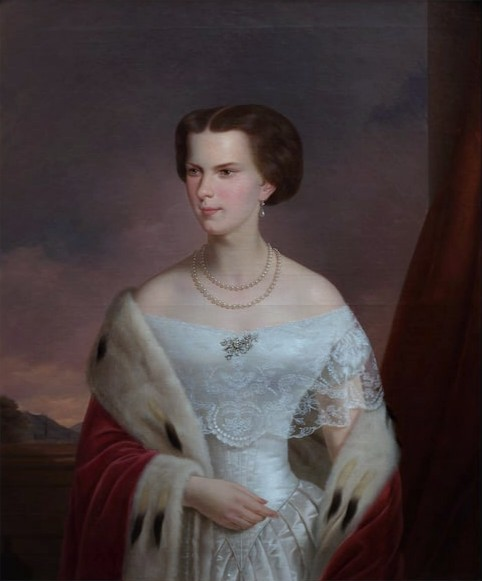
Portrait of the Empress Elisabeth of Austria, Josef Weidner, 1855

=== Paintings ===
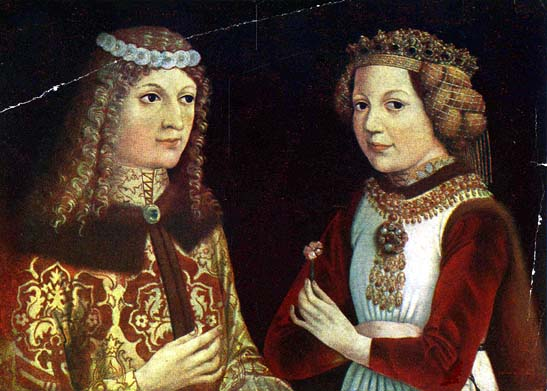
Louis II and Mary of Hungary, unknown artist, c. 1515

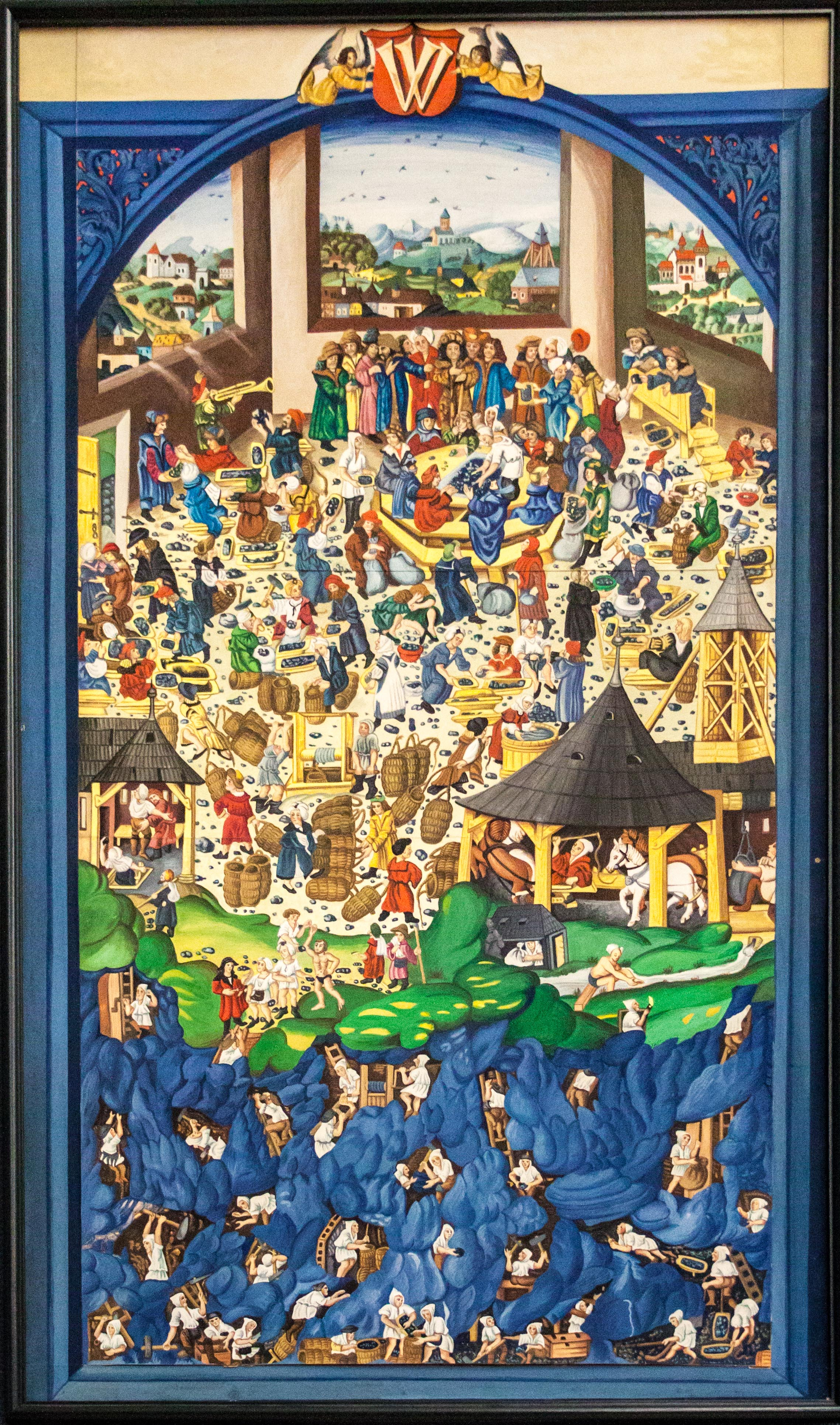
Silver mine, Kutna Hora, unknown painter, 15th century

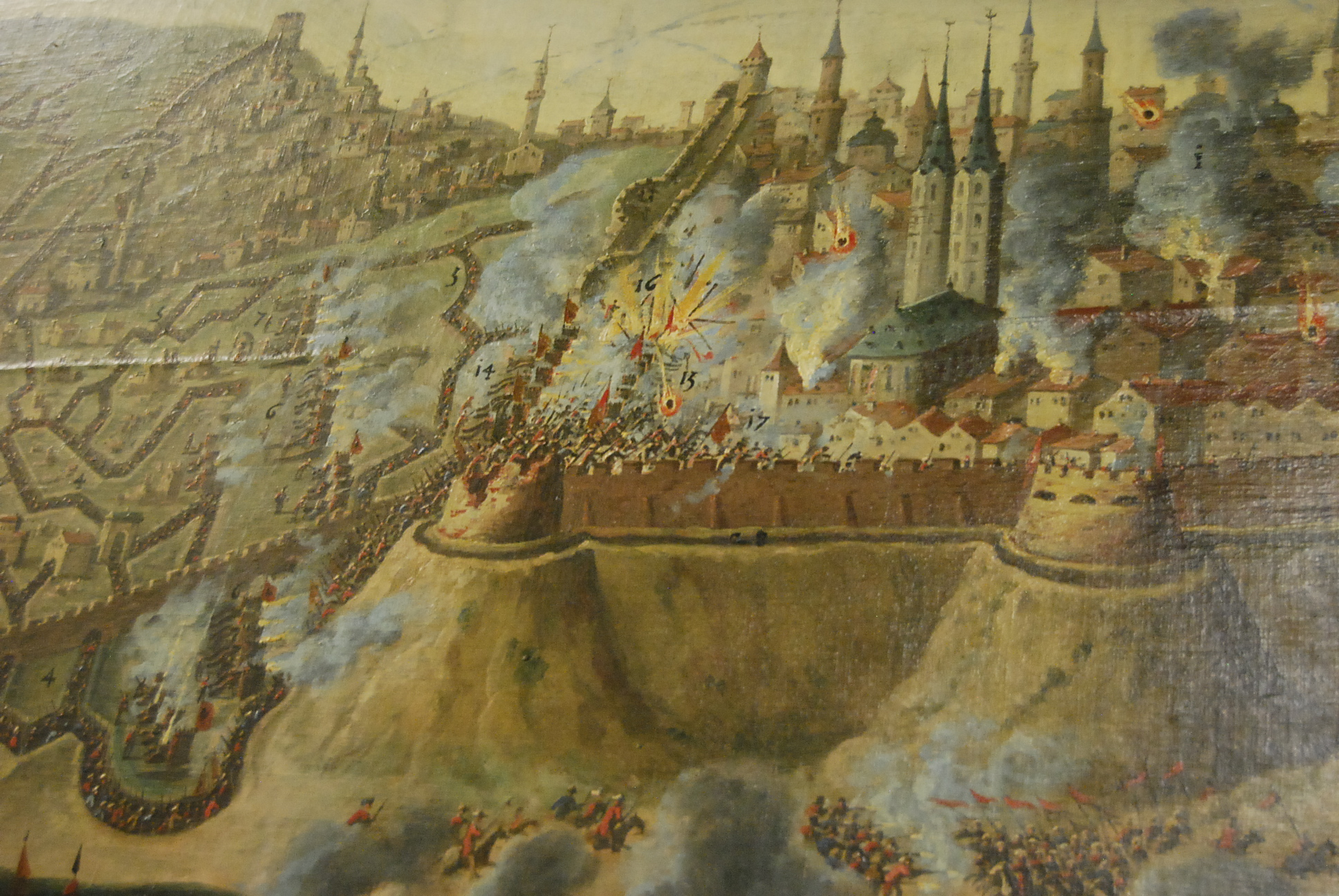
Siege of Buda (1686), Frans Geffels, 17th century

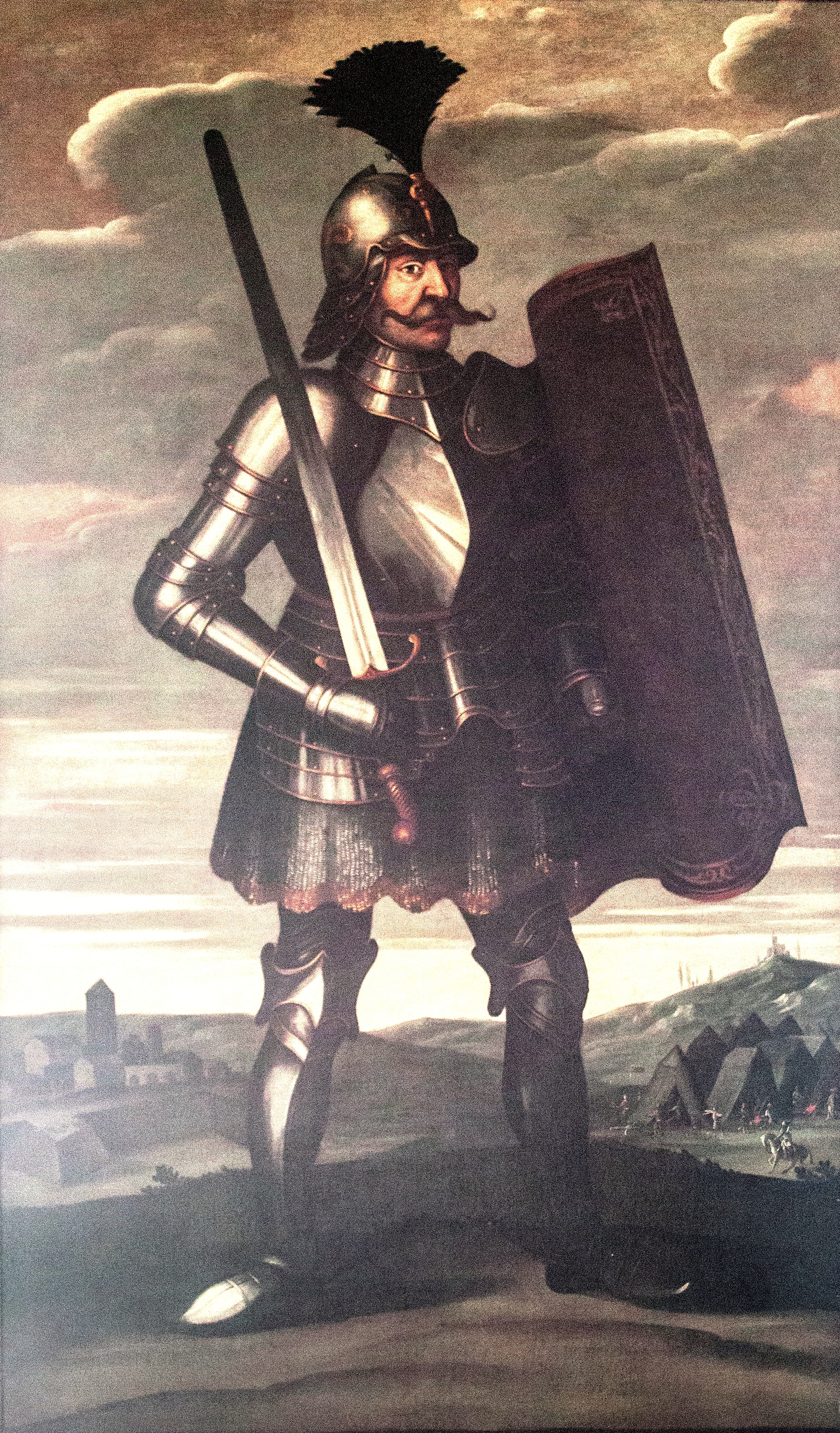
Hungarian Governor John Hunyadi, 17th century

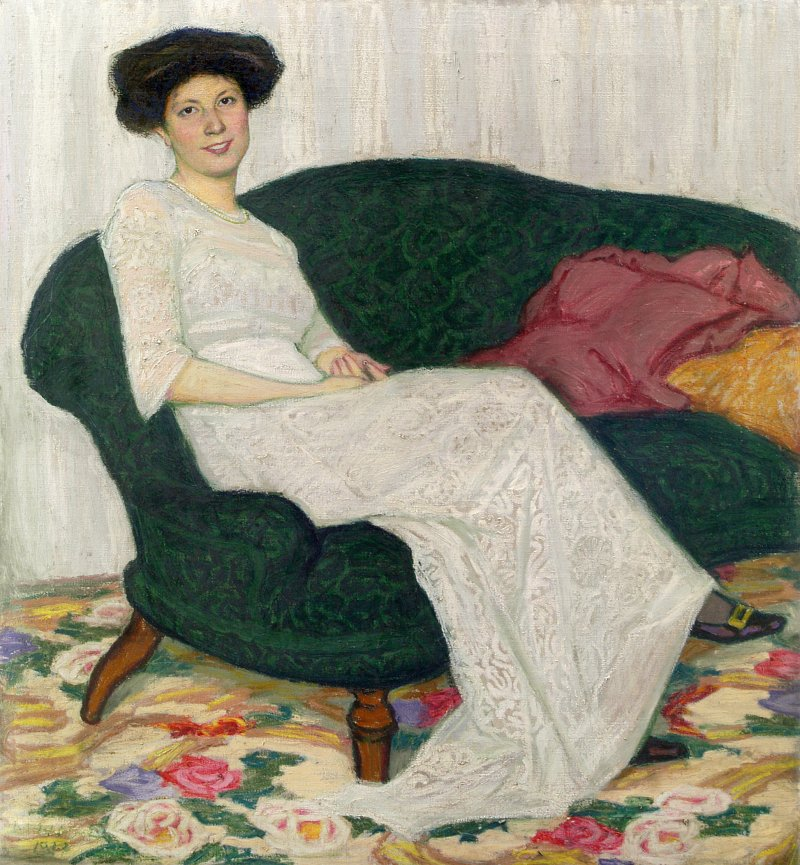
Dame in White Lace Dress, Ernestine Sehwag, 19th century

== See also ==
- Seuso Treasure
