= Anton Pius Riegel =

Austrian architect

Anton Pius Riegel or Rigel (Latin: Antonius Pius de Riegel; 1789 - ?) was an Austrian architect of the 19th century.

Anton (or Antonius) is mainly known for the design of the Károlyi Palace in Budapest Hungary (now housing the Petőfi Museum of Literature - Petőfi Irodalmi Múzeum) and of the Dolná Krupá manor. in Slovakia, though he was replaced as the master architect in 1883 by Henrich Koch. Based on letters to Jozef Brunswick, the grandson of Marie Henrieta Chotek), Riegel possibly designed the plans for the modernization of the Dolná Krupá manor house in 1813.
