= Dolná Krupá =

- Municipality
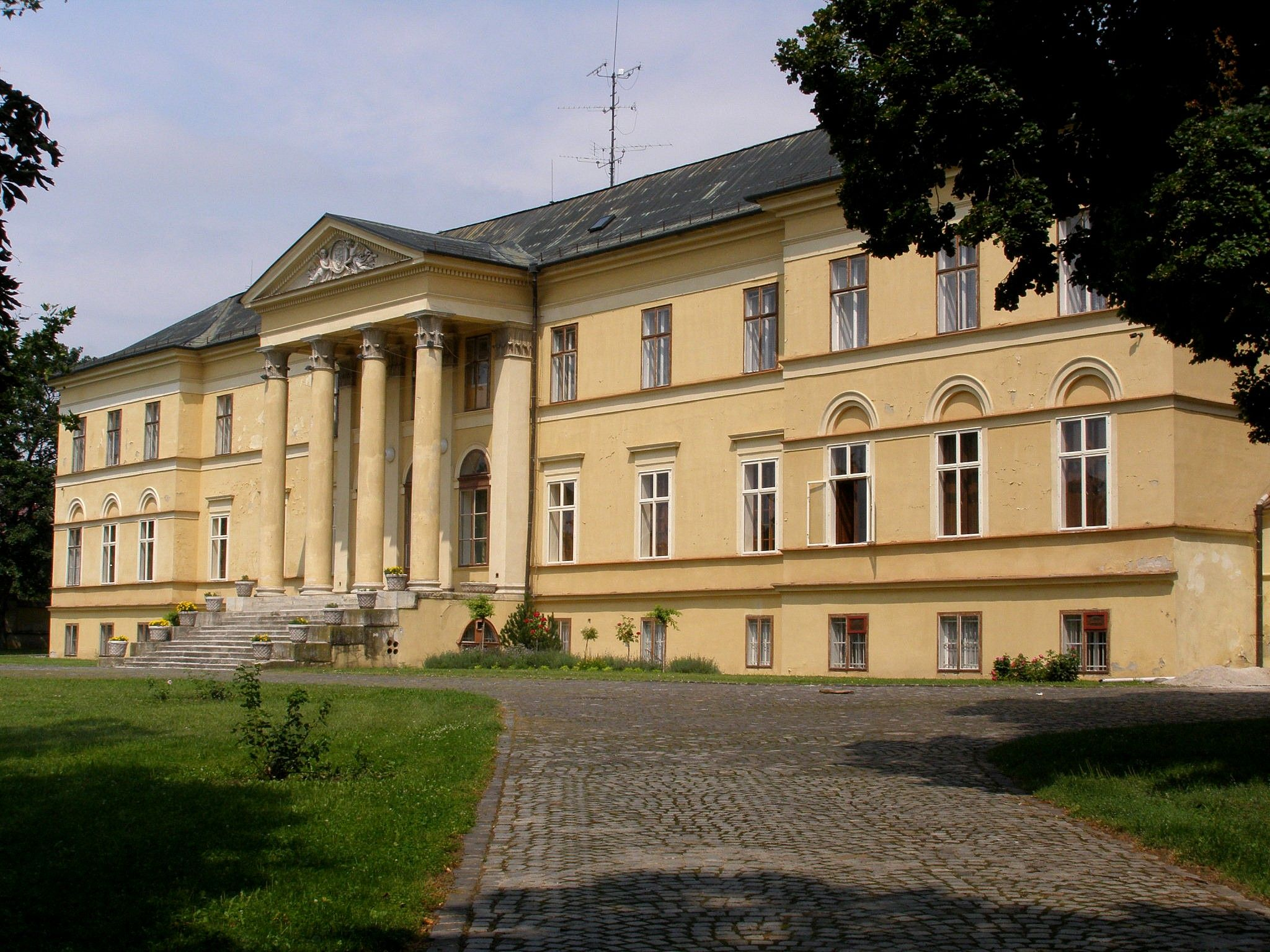
- Dolná Krupá manor

- Flag

- Location of Dolná Krupá in the Trnava Region Location of Dolná Krupá in Slovakia
- Coordinates: 48.48°N 17.55°E
- Country: Slovakia
- Region: Trnava Region
- District: Trnava District
- First mentioned: 1113

Area
  - Total: 24.63 km^{2} (9.51 sq mi)
- Elevation: 192 m (630 ft)

Population (2025)
  - Total: 2,430
- Time zone: UTC+1 (CET)
  - Summer (DST): UTC+2 (CEST)
- Postal code: 919 65
- Area code: +421 33
- Vehicle registration plate (until 2022): TT
- Website: www.dolnakrupa.sk

Dolná Krupá (German: Unterkrupa; Hungarian: Alsókorompa) is a village and municipality of Trnava District in the Trnava region of Slovakia. It is located in the Danubian Hills at around 12 km from the city of Trnava.

The important sights in the village are:

- the Saint Andrew church, built in 1807-1811
- the Dolná Krupá manor

The Dolná Krupá manor was one of the residences of the House of Chotek, one of the most prominent Bohemian noble families. It was the place of the Dolná Krupá rosarium created by Countess Marie Henrietta Chotek von Wognin.

== Geography ==
The municipality lies at an altitude of 192 metres (630 ft) and covers an area of 24.63 km^{2} (9.51 sq mi) (2025).

== Population ==
Population statistic (10 years)
Year	1995	2005	2015	2025
Count	2180	2233	2273	2430
Difference		+2.43%	+1.79%	+6.90%

Population statistic
Year	2024	2025
Count	2454	2430
Difference		−0.97%

It has a population of 2430 people (31 December 2025).

=== Ethnicity ===
Census 2021 (1+ %)
Ethnicity	Number	Fraction
Slovak	2274	93.38%
Not found out	147	6.03%
Total	2435	

In year 2021 was 2435 people by ethnicity 2274 as Slovak, 147 as Not found out, 11 as Other, 7 as Romani, 6 as Czech, 2 as Russian, 2 as Romanian, 1 as Vietnamese, 1 as Rusyn, 1 as German, 1 as Canadian and 1 as Bulgarian.

Note on population: The difference values of population numbers in the table "Population statistic" and in the sections "Ethnicity" & "Religion" is caused by the use of various statistical methods.

=== Religion ===
Census 2021 (1+ %)
Religion	Number	Fraction
Roman Catholic Church	1787	73.39%
None	428	17.58%
Not found out	156	6.41%
Total	2435	

In year 2021 was 2435 people by religion 1787 from Roman Catholic Church, 428 from None, 156 from Not found out, 16 from Evangelical Church, 10 from Ad hoc movements, 9 from Greek Catholic Church, 7 from Other, 6 from Christian Congregations in Slovakia, 5 from Buddhism, 3 from Other and not ascertained christian church, 2 from Calvinist Church, 2 from Eastern Orthodox Church, 1 from Paganism and natural spirituality, 1 from Jehovah's Witnesses, 1 from Islam and 1 from Apostolic Church.

== Famous people ==
- John Dopyera, inventor of Dobro

== Genealogical resources ==
The records for genealogical research are available at the state archive "Statny Archiv in Bratislava, Slovakia"

- Roman Catholic church records (births/marriages/deaths): 1689-1895 (parish A)
- Lutheran church records (births/marriages/deaths): 1666-1895 (parish B)

== See also ==
- List of municipalities and towns in Slovakia
