= Christian Heinrich Nebbien =

German-born landscape architect

- Born: 22 September 1778; Lübeck
- Died: 2 December 1841 (aged 63); Glogau
- Occupation: landscape architect

Christian Heinrich Nebbien, also known as Heinrich Nebbien or Henrik Nebbien, (1778–1841) was a German-born landscape architect, mainly active in Hungary.

His most important project was the Városliget park at the end of Andrássy Avenue in Budapest (1817).

Other projects for which he is known are:

- the park of the Betliar Manor House in Hungary, now Slovakia (1783–1795)
- the park of the Alsókorompa / Dolná Krupá mansion in Hungary, now Slovakia (1813–1819);
- The park in Martonvásár, Hungary.
- The park of Soborsin Castle, Soborsin /Săvârșin, Arad, Hungary, now Romania

He also wrote a book on the methods of increasing agricultural output, published in Prague in 1835.

== Works ==
- Wie vielmal wohlfeiler kann der Landwirth produziren? Und: Wie vielmal größer kann der Ertrag des Bodens werden? – Prag, J. G. Calve, 1835.
