= Dolná Krupá manor =

Historic building in Dolná Krupá

- Kaštieľ v Dolnej Krupej
- Dolná Krupá, Trnava Region, Slovakia
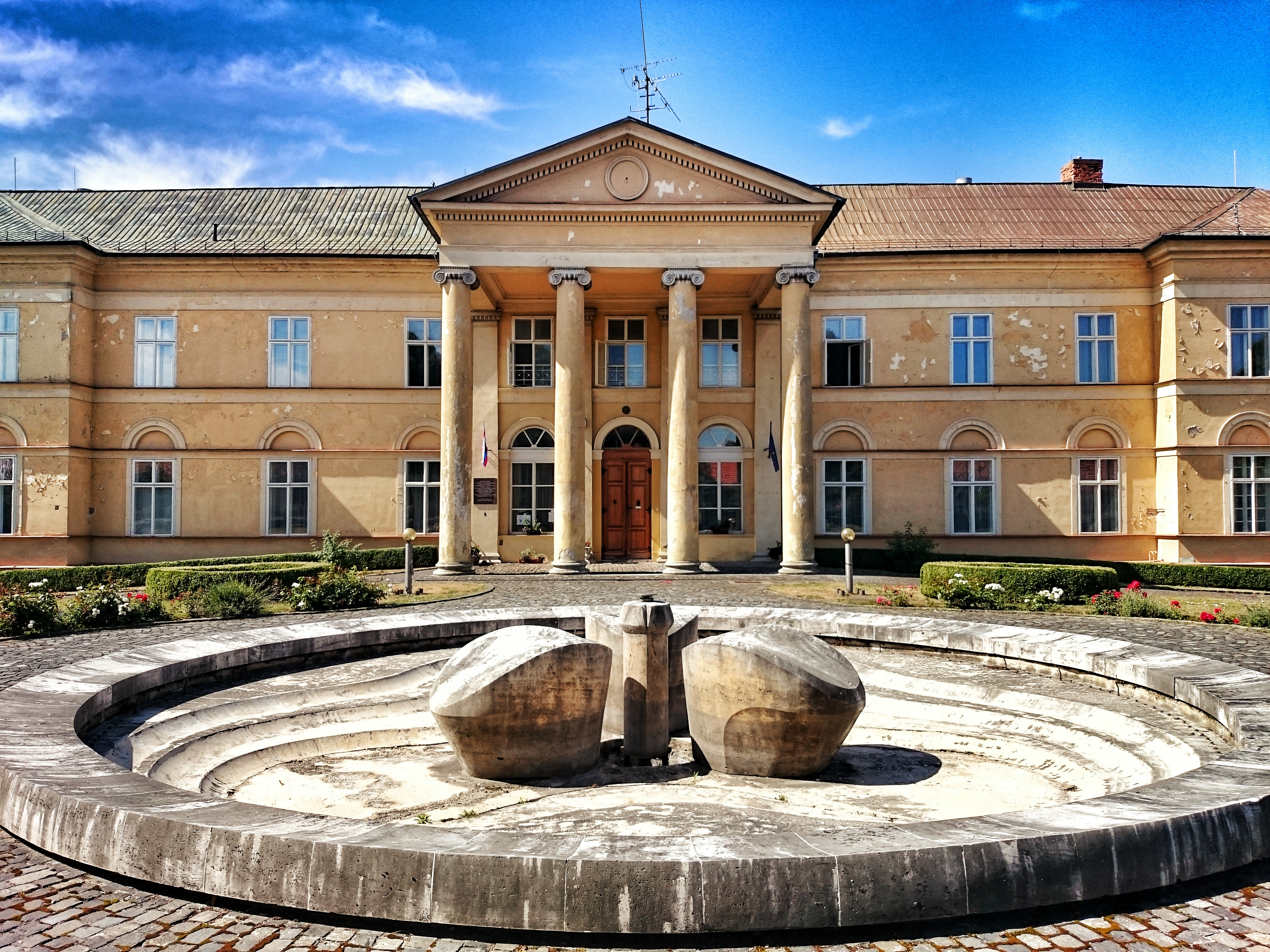

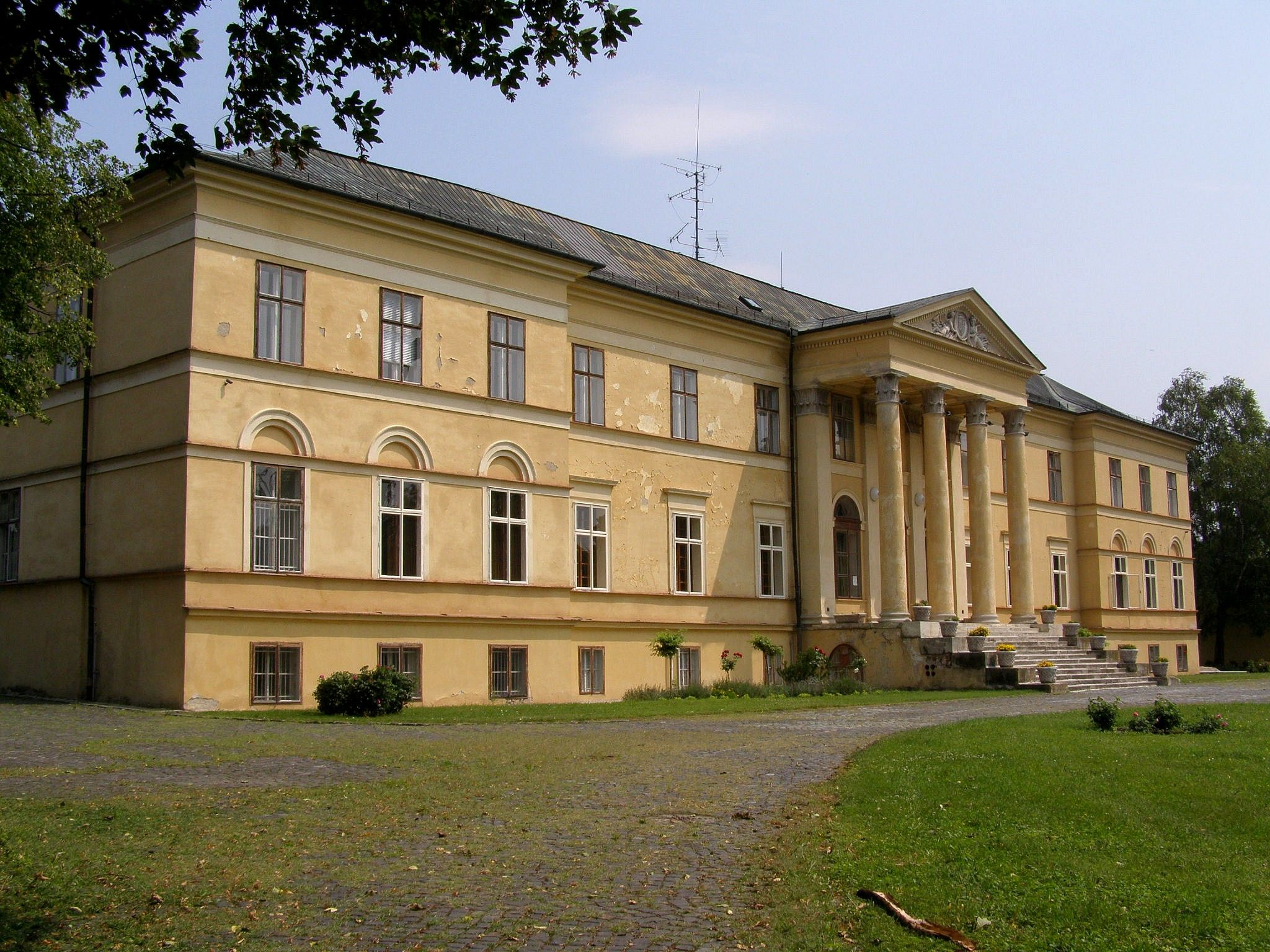

Site information
- Type: Castle
- Condition: Good

Location
- Coordinates: 48.484167°N 17.546111°E

Site history
- Built: 1793 – 95

Dolná Krupá Manor (Slovak: Kaštieľ v Dolnej Krupej; also called Brunswick Castle after the Brunswick family) is a classicist castle from the 18th century, located in the village of Dolná Krupá about 10 kilometers north of the city of Trnava in Slovakia.

The manor built between the years 1793–95, standing on the site of an older one, probably from the first half of the 18th century, was built for the Brunswick family by the Viennese builder Hausmann. In 1820, it was partially renovated with antique elements by Anton Pius Riegel. The mansion also includes an extensive English park from the first third of the 19th century by the Belgian architect H. Nebbien.

== History ==
=== Construction ===
The history of the manor is closely linked to the Hungarian noble family Brunsvik. The family originated in Germany (Stettin) and is first documented in the Kingdom of Hungary with Tobias Brunsvik, who settled in Freistadt an der Waag. His grandson, Michael II Brunsvik, married Margarethe Theresia Vitalis von Vitalisfalva in around 1710, who brought the Unterkrupa estate into the marriage as her dowry. Their son, Anton I Brunsvik, studied law at the University of Trnava and inherited the Unterkrupa estate. Between 1749 and 1756, he commissioned the construction of a new Baroque castle on the site of the old one, based on plans by the imperial court architect Johann Baptist Martinelli. Anton I was promoted to the rank of Count by Empress Maria Theresa in 1775 for his services and was thus also allowed to use the noble title ‘de Korompa’ in his name. He also received the estate of Maronvásár as a fief.

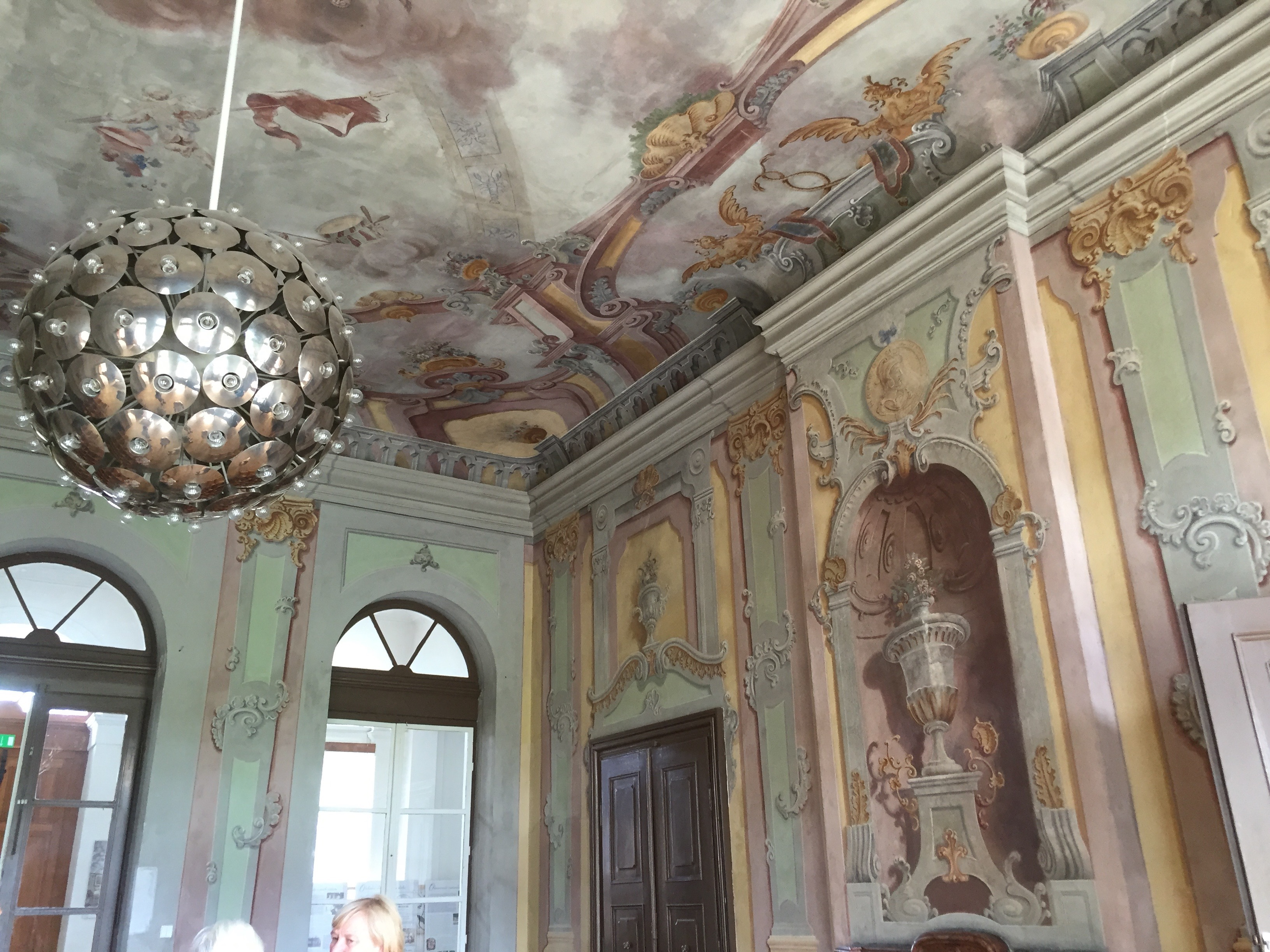
The interior of the manor.

After the death of Anton I, the family fortune was divided among his sons in 1783. Anton II received the Mártonvásár estate, and his younger son Joseph received the Unterkrupa estate. Between 1792 and 1796, Joseph had Unterkrupa Castle rebuilt in the Baroque style according to plans by Johann Joseph Thalherr, architect of the Hungarian Royal Chamber. The newly created complex included a theater, an orangery, a bathhouse, and a gardener's cottage. A few years later (around 1813), he commissioned the then 24-year-old Austrian architect Anton Pius Riegel to carry out further construction work on the castle, which Riegel remodeled in the style of modern Neoclassicism. Between 1813 and 1819, an English park covering 247 hectares was created at the behest of the client. The German garden and landscape architect Christian Heinrich Nebbien was commissioned to design it. The park was completed in 1822, as can be seen from the surviving garden plans.

=== 1918–1992 ===
The collapse of the Austro-Hungarian Empire already marked a turning point for Unterkrupa. The former 'Unter-Korompa', which had belonged to the Kingdom of Hungary, was now called Dolná Krupá and became part of Czechoslovakia. In 1923, as part of a land reform carried out by the new Czechoslovak state, part of the Chotek family's property was expropriated. Two years later, the Choke family had to give 518 hectares of their land and four manor farms to the state. This was followed by years of legal wrangling, which finally ended with a settlement on June 12, 1933.

After the Second World War, the Dolná Krupá manor began to collapse. Following the Red Army's invasion, large parts of the park were destroyed. The former manor house was looted and its contents stolen. In the 1950s, the communist authorities then in power in Czechoslovakia established a psychiatric clinic in the manor house. Later it became a home for composers.

After the Velvet Revolution of 1989/1990, the estate was taken over by the Slovak National Museum, which established a music museum there. The manor house now displays antique musical instruments and has become a memorial to famous composers who lived in Slovakia, such as Ernst von Dohnányi, Alexander Albrecht, and Franz Schmidt. In 1992, a small Beethoven memorial museum was established in the gardener's cottage, highlighting in particular the composer's connections to ancient Hungary.

=== Recent years: 2003–present ===
Since 2003, the manor has been part of the Music Museum of the Slovak National Museum. The park also contains the 48m tall Mammoth Sequoia, planted by the manor's tenant Rudolf Chotek.

== Gardens ==
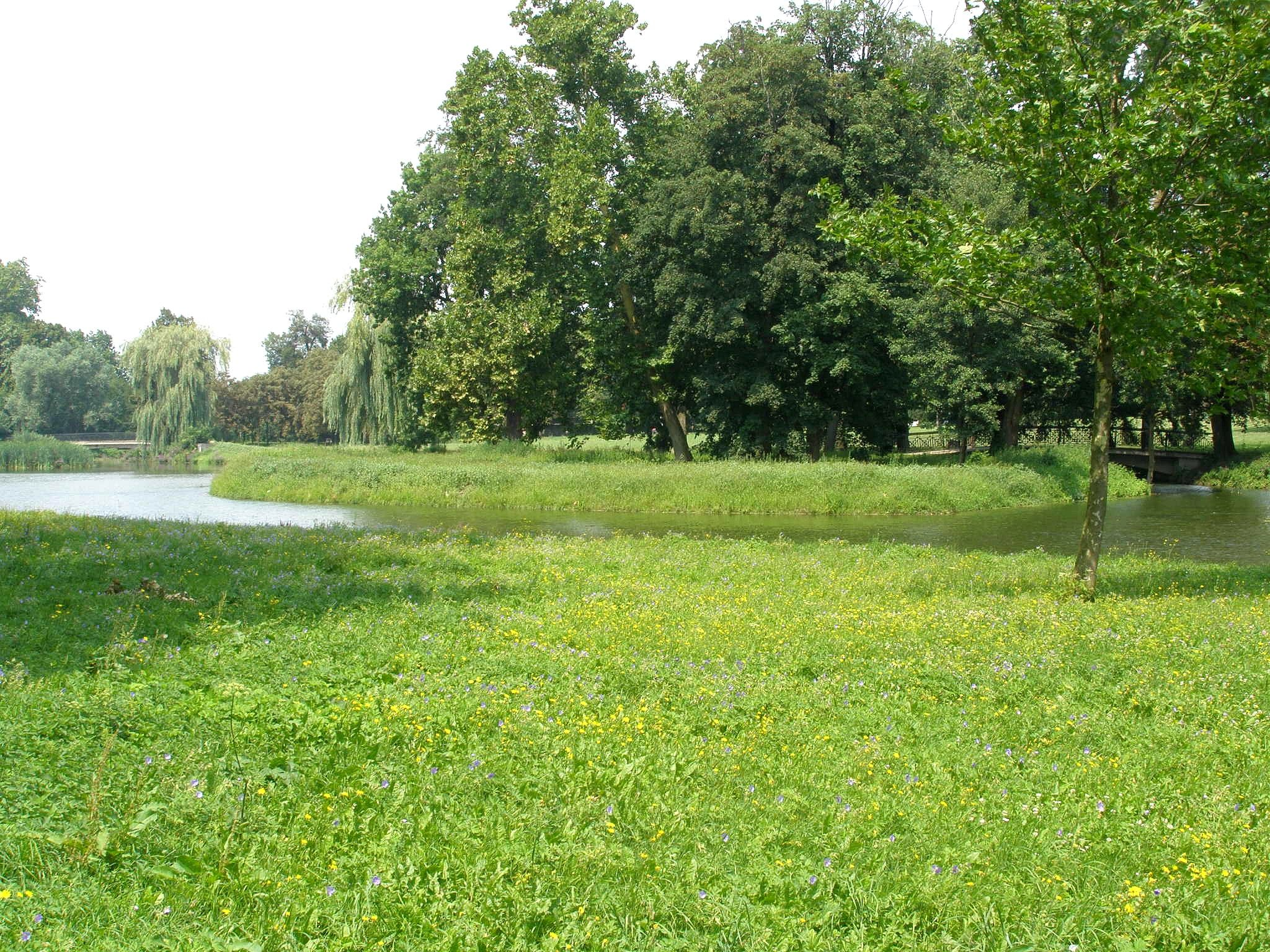
A part of gardens in 2009

At the same time as the manor was originally built, the gardens were placed next to it. Plane trees, pine trees, and flowers were planted there near the end of the 18th century. The garden were used in multiple ways, with there being vineyards, orchards, meadows and an area serving as a hunting ground. In the 19th century, a rare sequoia tree with a height of 45 meters was found in the gardens.

== See also ==
- List of castles in Slovakia
