= Károlyi Palace, Budapest (Károlyi Street) =

Building in Budapest, Hungary

Károlyi Palace
- Károlyi-palota
- Palotanegyed, Budapest, Hungary
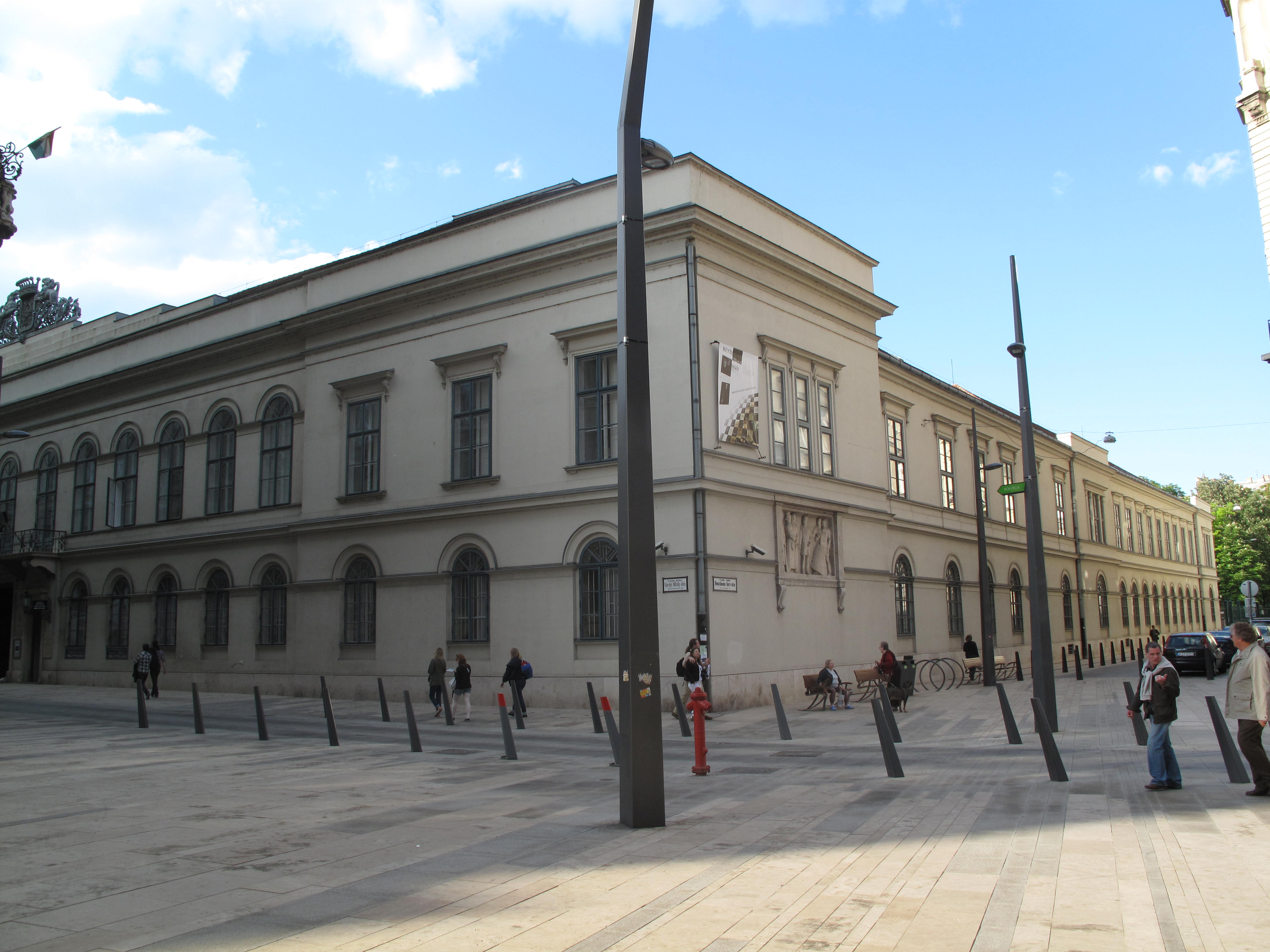
- The Palace, 2011

Site information
- Type: Palace
- Owner: Government of Hungary

Location
- Location of Károlyi Palace in Hungary
- Coordinates: 47°29′29″N 19°03′30″E

Site history
- Built: 17th century
- Built for: Károlyi family
- Architect: Anton Pius Riegel, Heinrich Koch, Mihály Pollack, Miklós Ybl

Károlyi Palace is a 17th-century palace located at 16 Károlyi Street and Henszlmann Imre Street in Palotanegyed, Budapest, Hungary. The palace was built in its current neo-classical style by the Károlyi family. Since 1957, it has been the home of the Petőfi Literary Museum.

== History ==
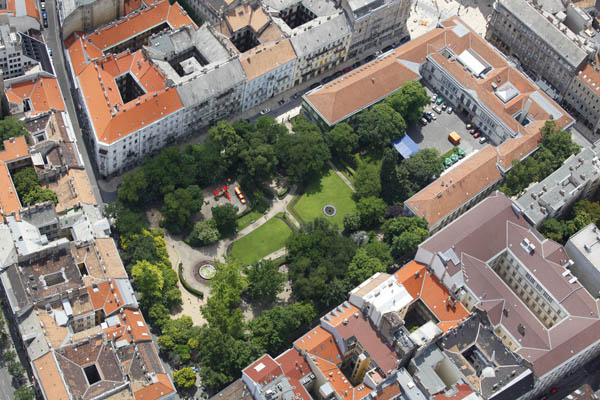
Aerial photograph of the palace and gardens, June 2012

The original palace was built in the late 17th century, however, Count Antal Károlyi bought the palace in 1768. During its 150 years of ownership, the Károlyi family had the palace renovated several times. Count Antal Károlyi's initial renovation was finished in 1791. Two generations later, Count György Károlyi began substantial renovations in 1832, turning the building into its modern neo-classical style. The work was started by Viennese architect Anton Pius Riegel and completed by architect Heinrich Koch.

Beginning in 1835, construction was overseen by architect Mihály Pollack, and the renovated building was officially opened in 1841. Later in the 19th century, architect Miklós Ybl carried out further restoration and expansion, including the construction of a greenhouse, the fireplaces and likely the decorative design of the Chapel.

From 1932 to 1953, it served as the location of the Budapest Picture Gallery. Since 1957, it has served as the Petőfi Literary Museum. In addition to the Museum, the Károlyi Palace housed the warehouses of the Hungarian National Museum and the Budapest History Museum until 1998. Between 1996 and 2000, two years before they moved out, the palace's historic reconstruction began, which served the three basic activities of the Petőfi Museum: scientific collecting and processing work, the creation of exhibitions and the organization of cultural events. The museum underwent another renovation in 2022.

In 1997, a small archeological excavation in the middle lane of the courtyard began which turned into a full excavation in 1998. The remains of the stone cellar and food storage of a Turkish house, part of a 13th century village, as well as 23 graves from the 11th-12th century cemetery, and the modern remains of the baroque palace that once stood there were found.

=== Interior ===
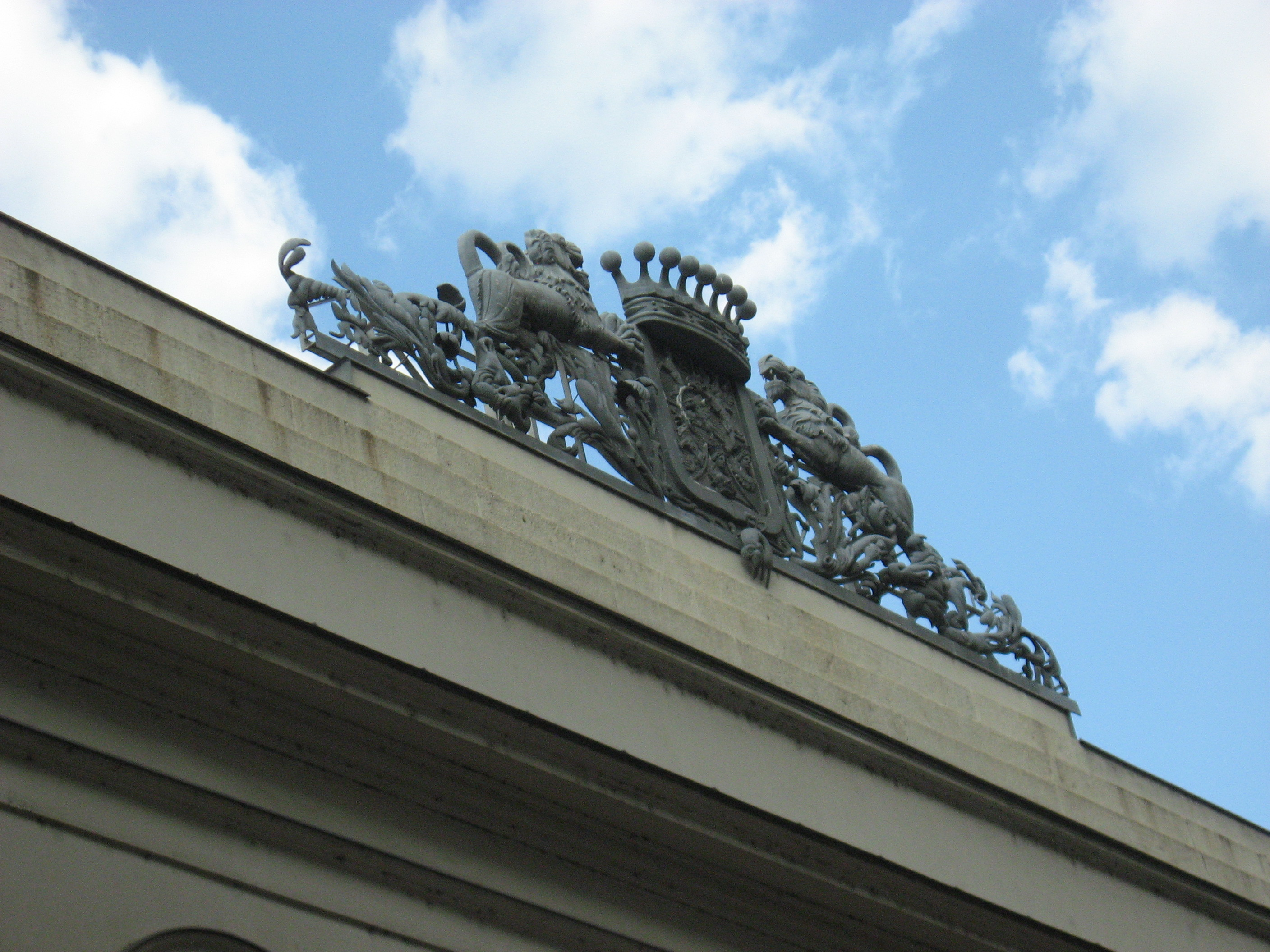
Coat of arms of Count Károlyi, atop the palace, by Josef Klieber, 1833

- Bártfay Hall: located on the main floor wing, was part of Count György Károlyi and, his wife, Karolina Zichy's, suite.
- Winter Garden: a room covered with white floral damask on a green background, a flower salon and a picture gallery, the library and the Banquet Hall open into the Aula
- Banquet Hall: a large dance hall with five windows. Marble fireplace, large gold-framed mirrors. White artificial marble walls. Gilded Corinthian column-headed pilasters on the sides of the windows. Stucco ceiling. During the Pest flood of 1838, Count Györgyn Károlyi arranged accommodation here for people who had become homeless.
- Red Salon: reconstruction, the original decoration has not been preserved, the stucco decoration of their ceiling has also been destroyed.
- Balcony Room: During the time of Count György Károlyi, it was a small dance hall. It is located above the triple gate in the middle. It has a balcony with a stone console and iron railings. The white room with three windows, its artificial marble walls are decorated with gold framing and cornices.
- Lotz Salon: the mural on the ceiling was brought here during the time of the Budapest Art Gallery. Károly Lotz's work depicts the Muses.
- House chapel: it was carved out of a section of riverbed in the 1880s at the request of Count Gyula Károlyi, its ornate neo-Renaissance wood paneling is attributed to Miklós Ybl.

== Gallery ==
=== Historic photographs ===
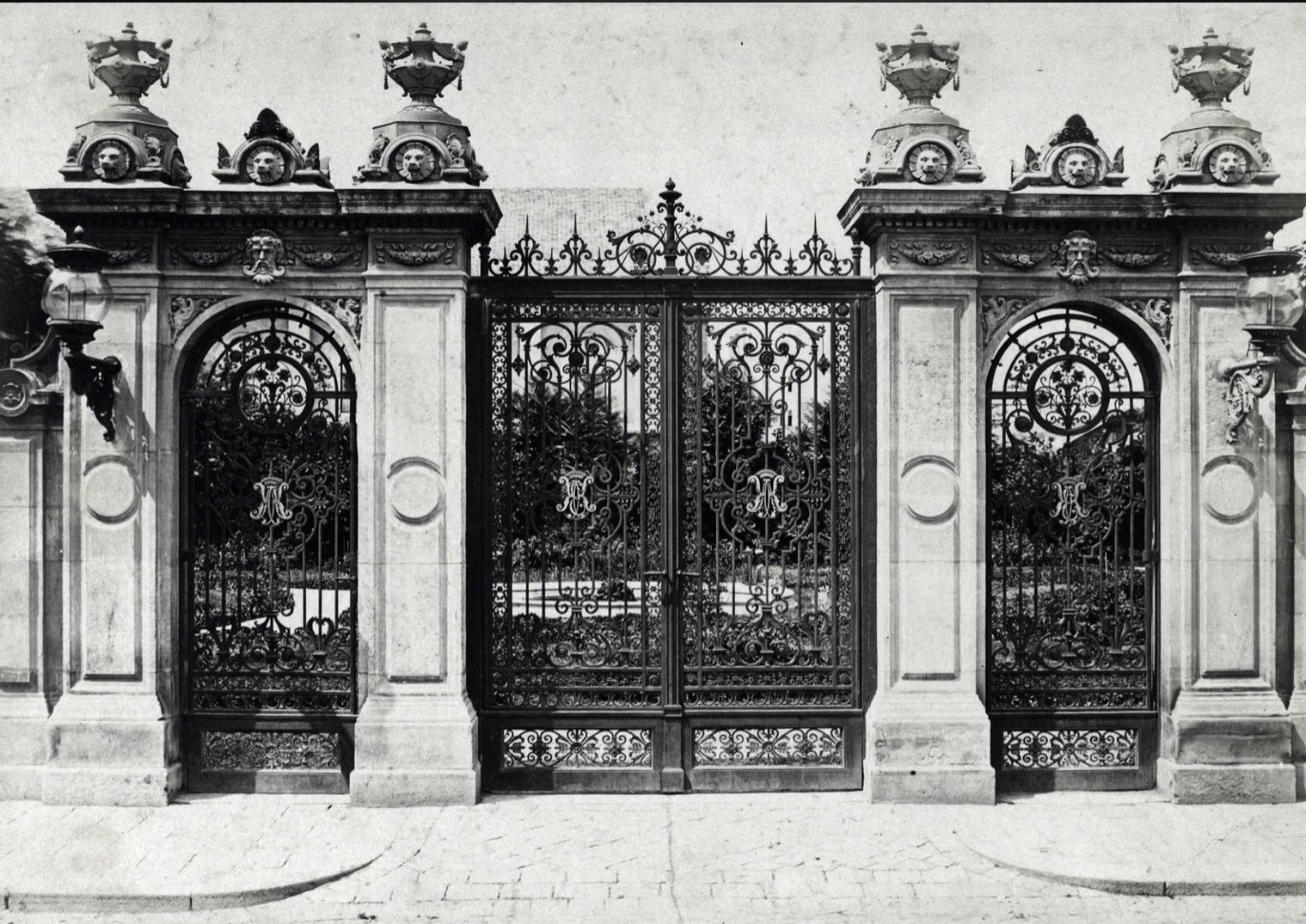
Garden gates, 1881

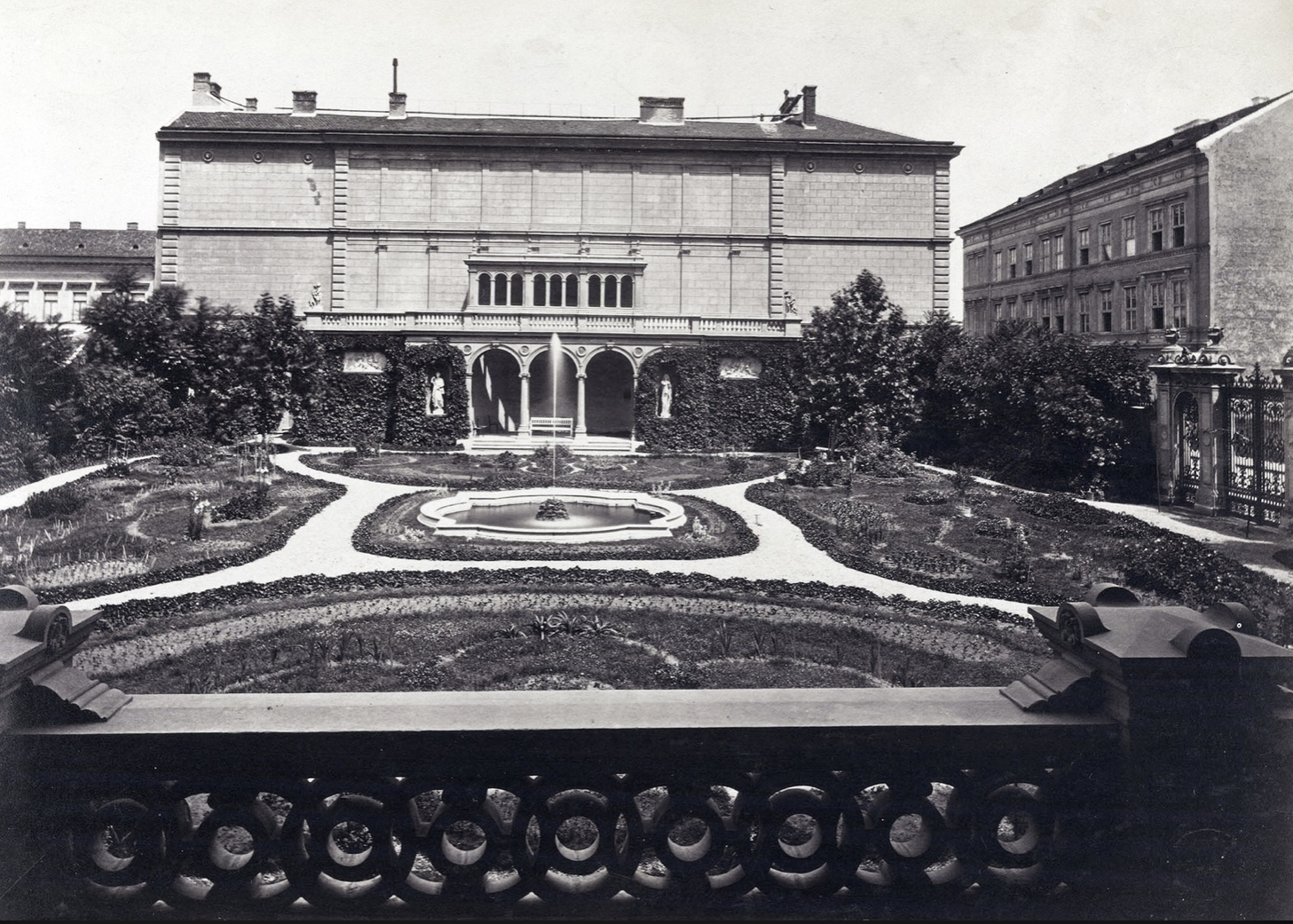
View of the garden, 1881

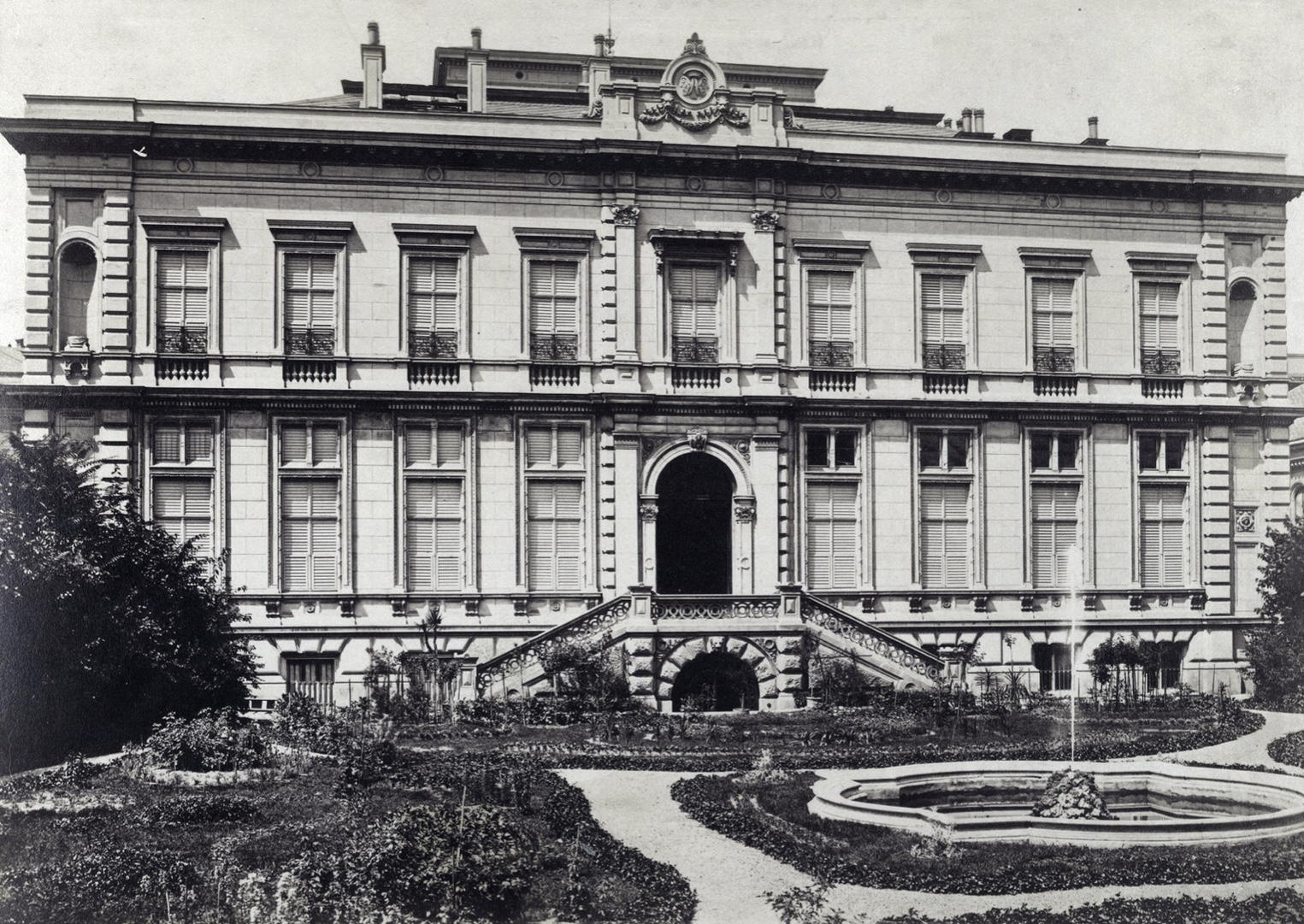
Rear view of the palace, 1881

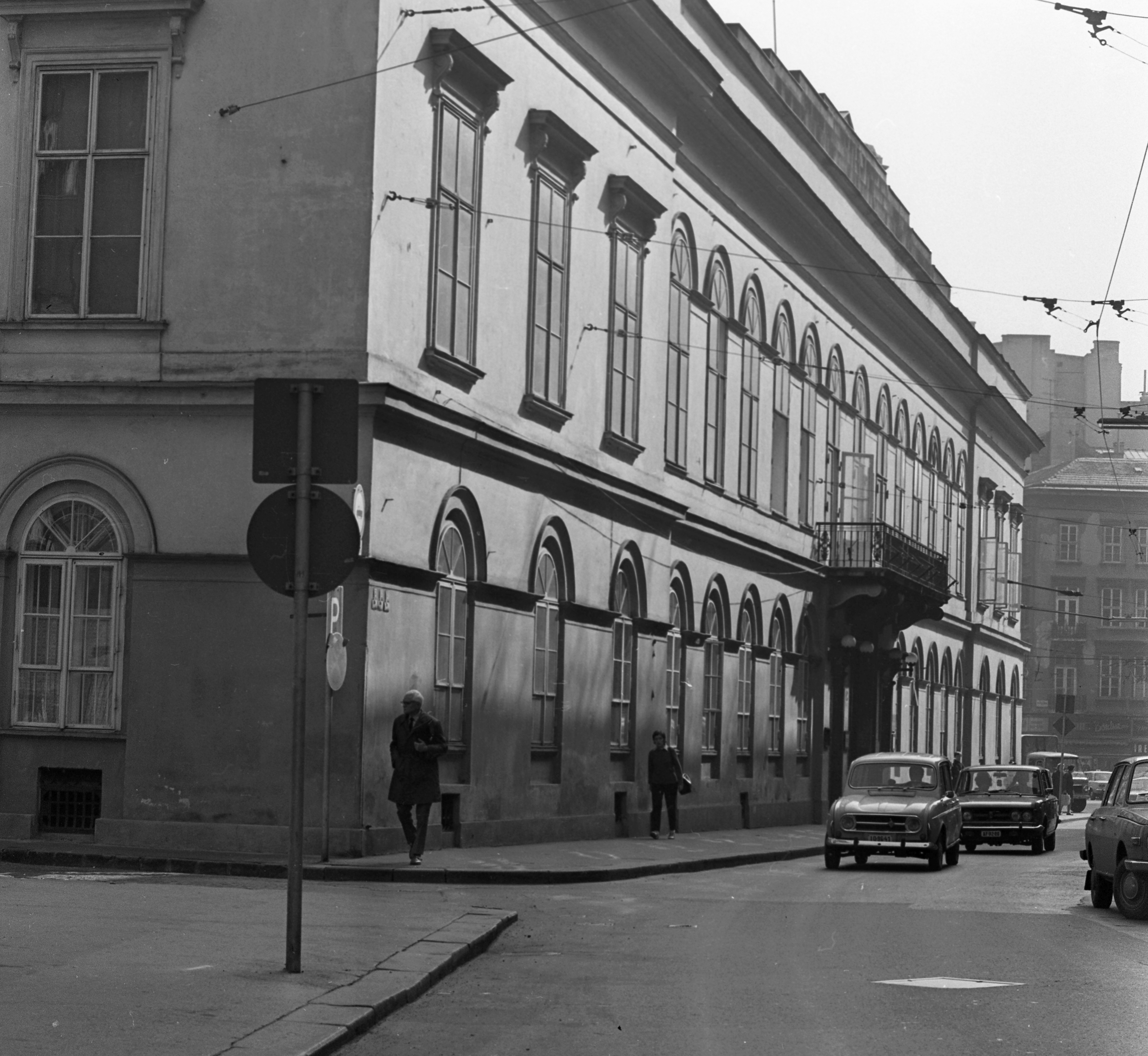
Károlyi Street and Ferenczy István Street, 1972

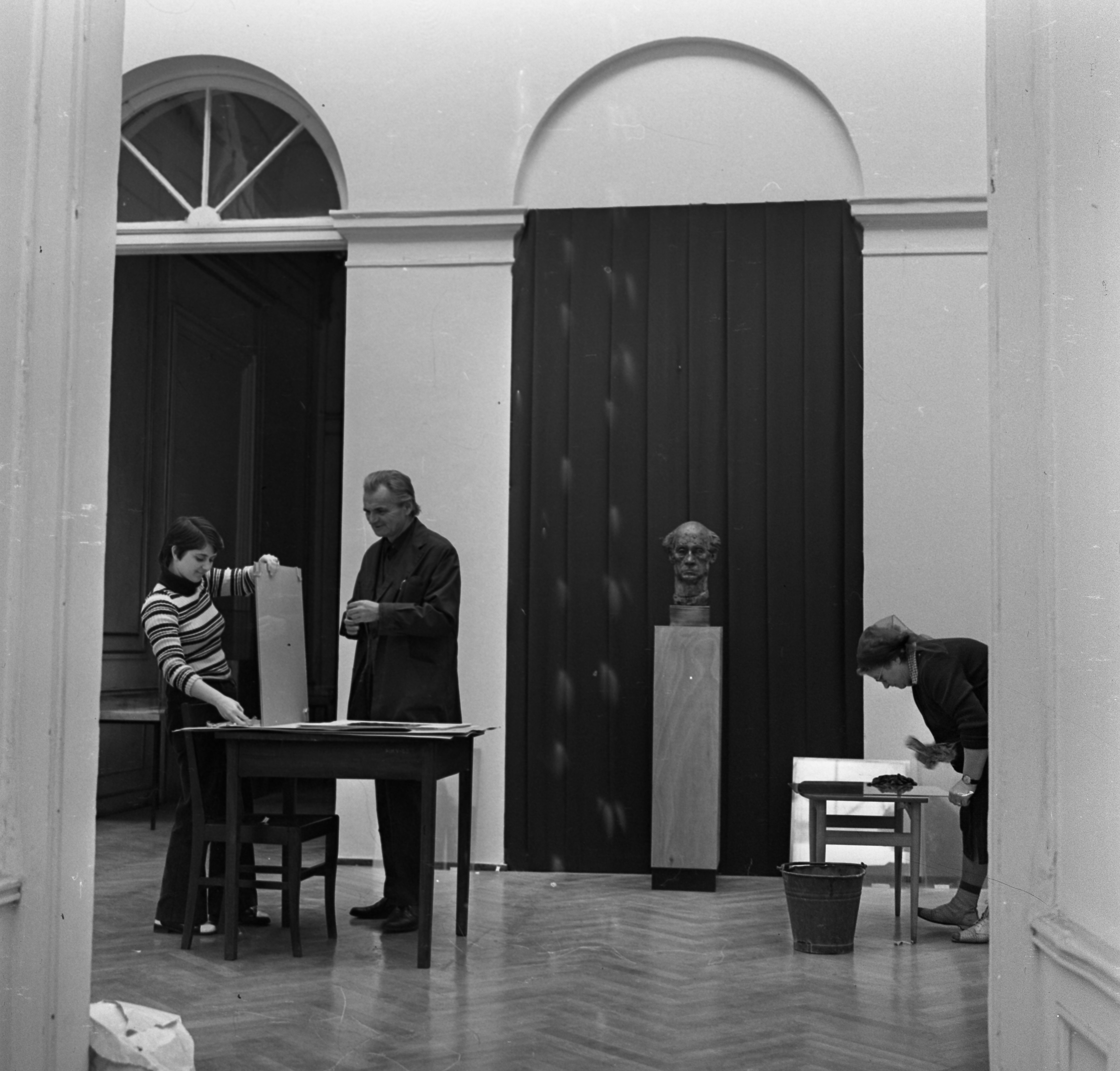
Interior of the Petőfi Museum, 1972

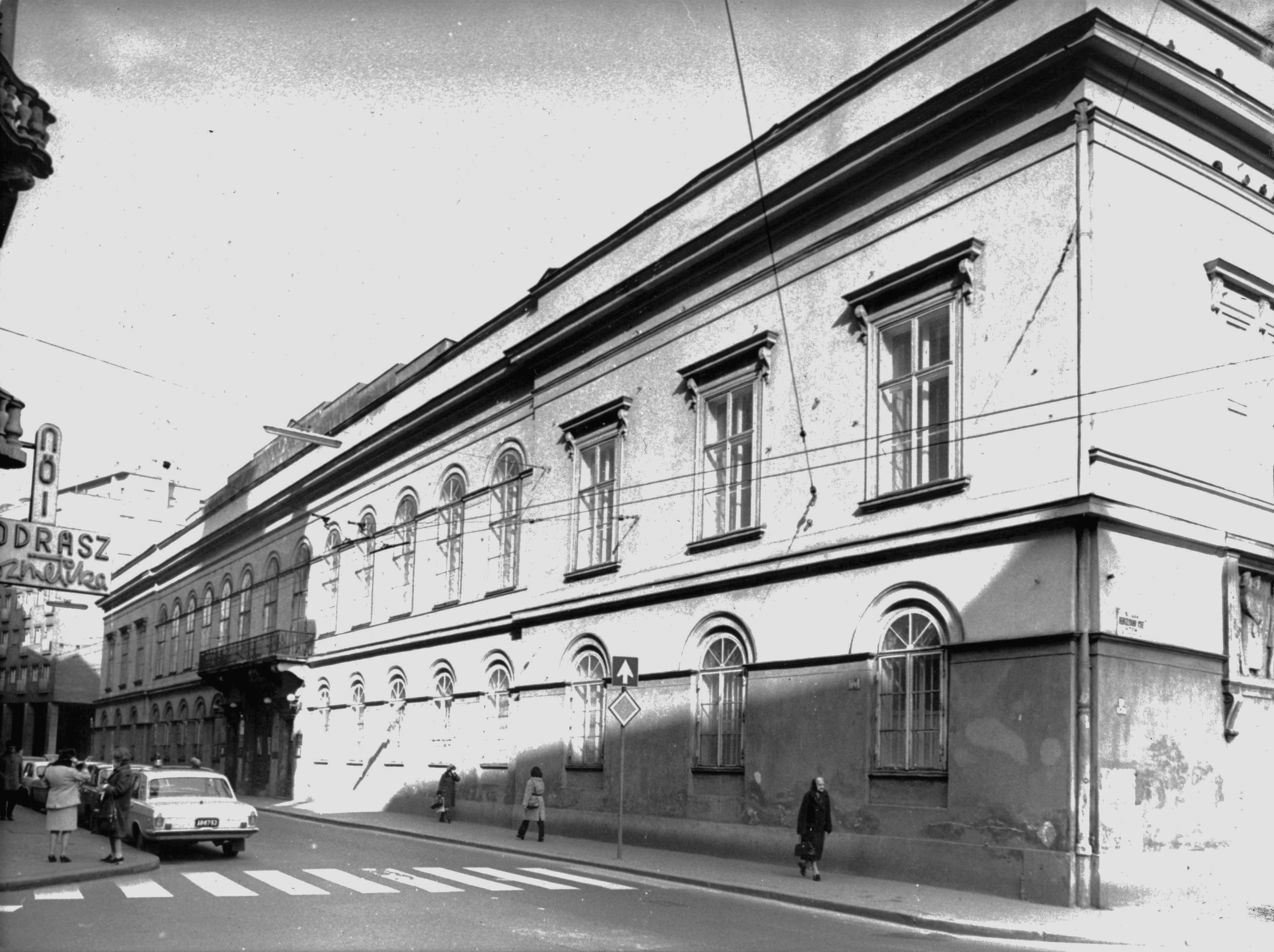
Károlyi Street seen from Egyetem Square, 1973

=== Interior ===
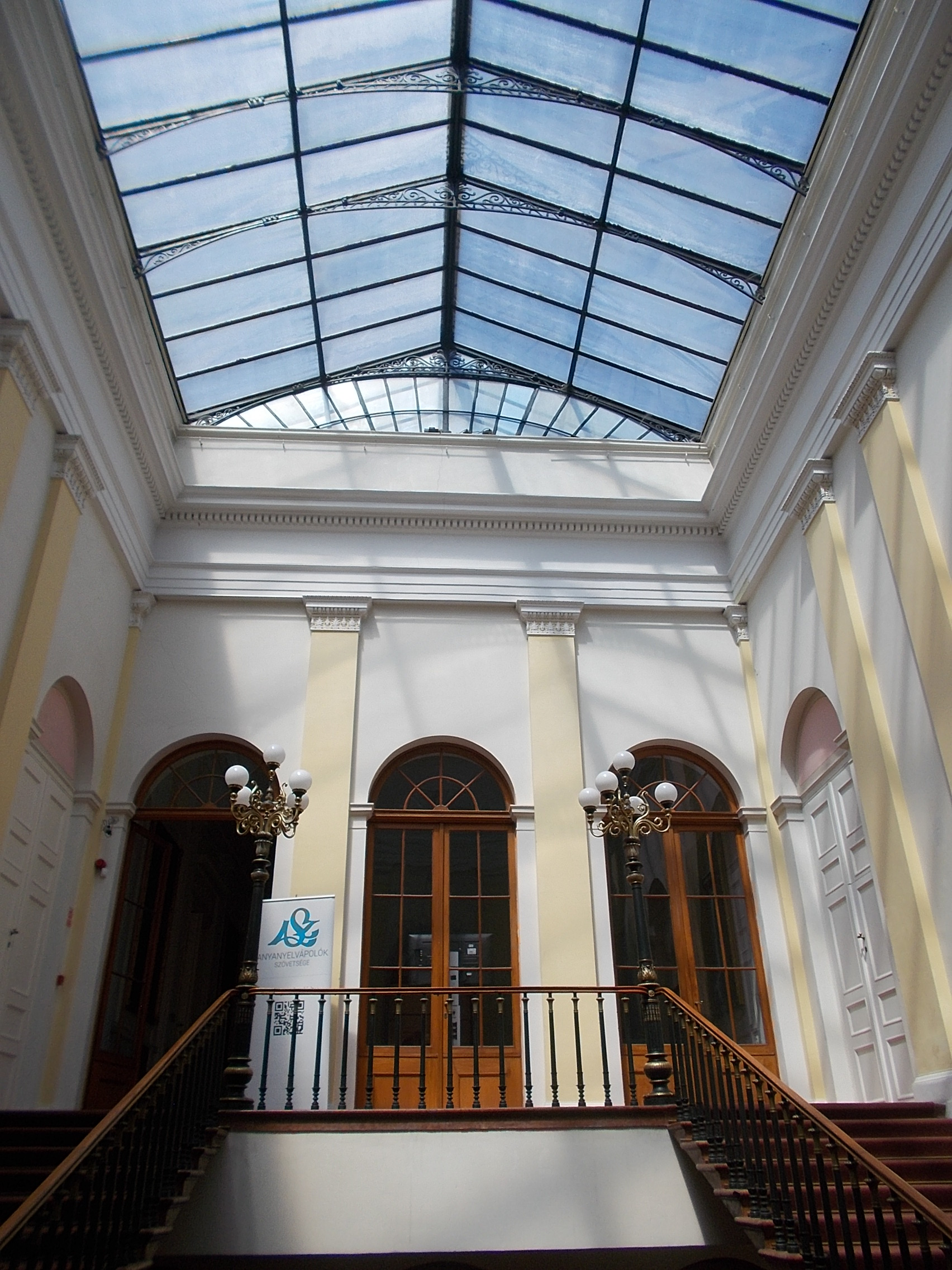
Grand staircase

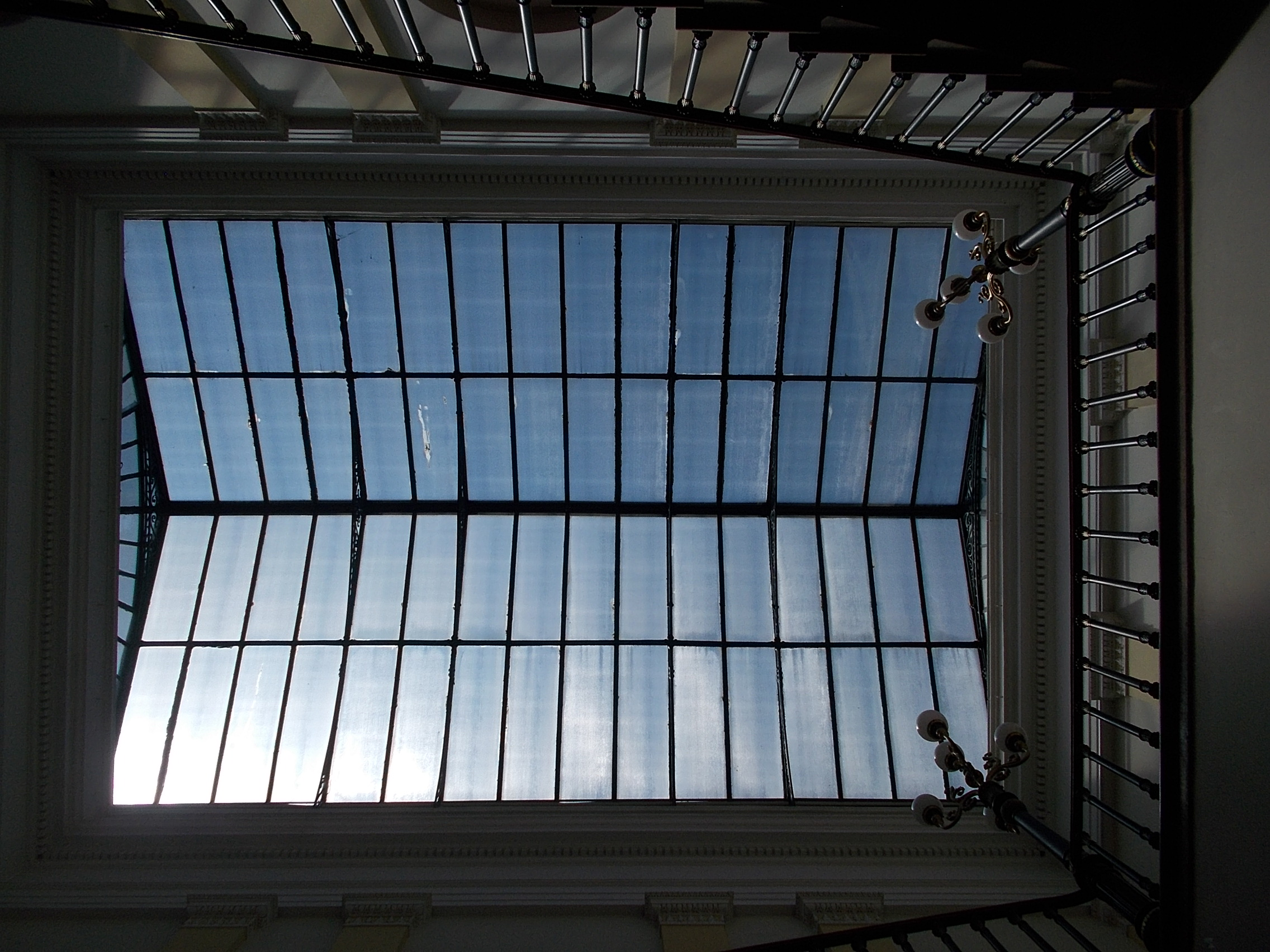
Glass roof

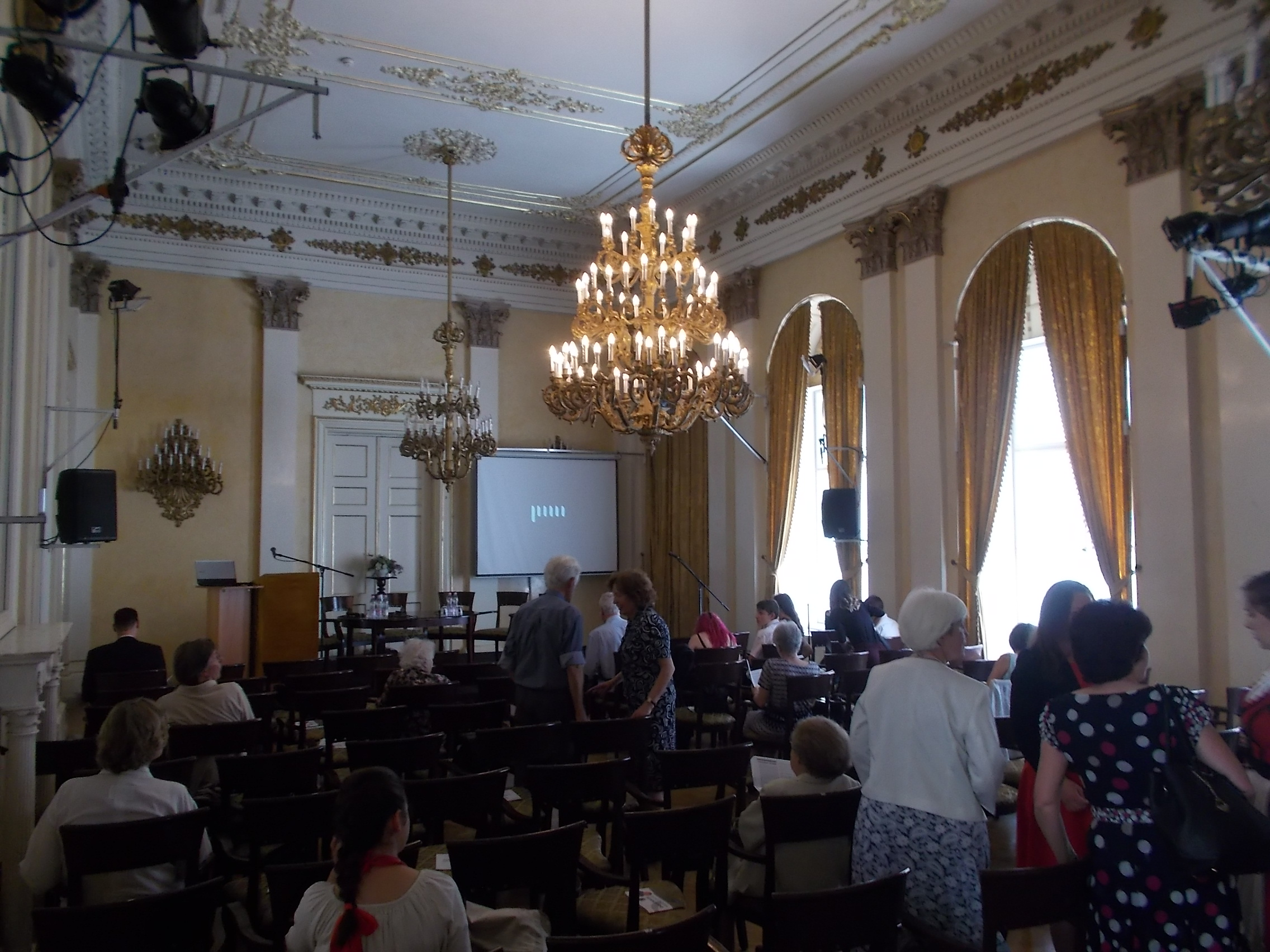
Grand ballroom

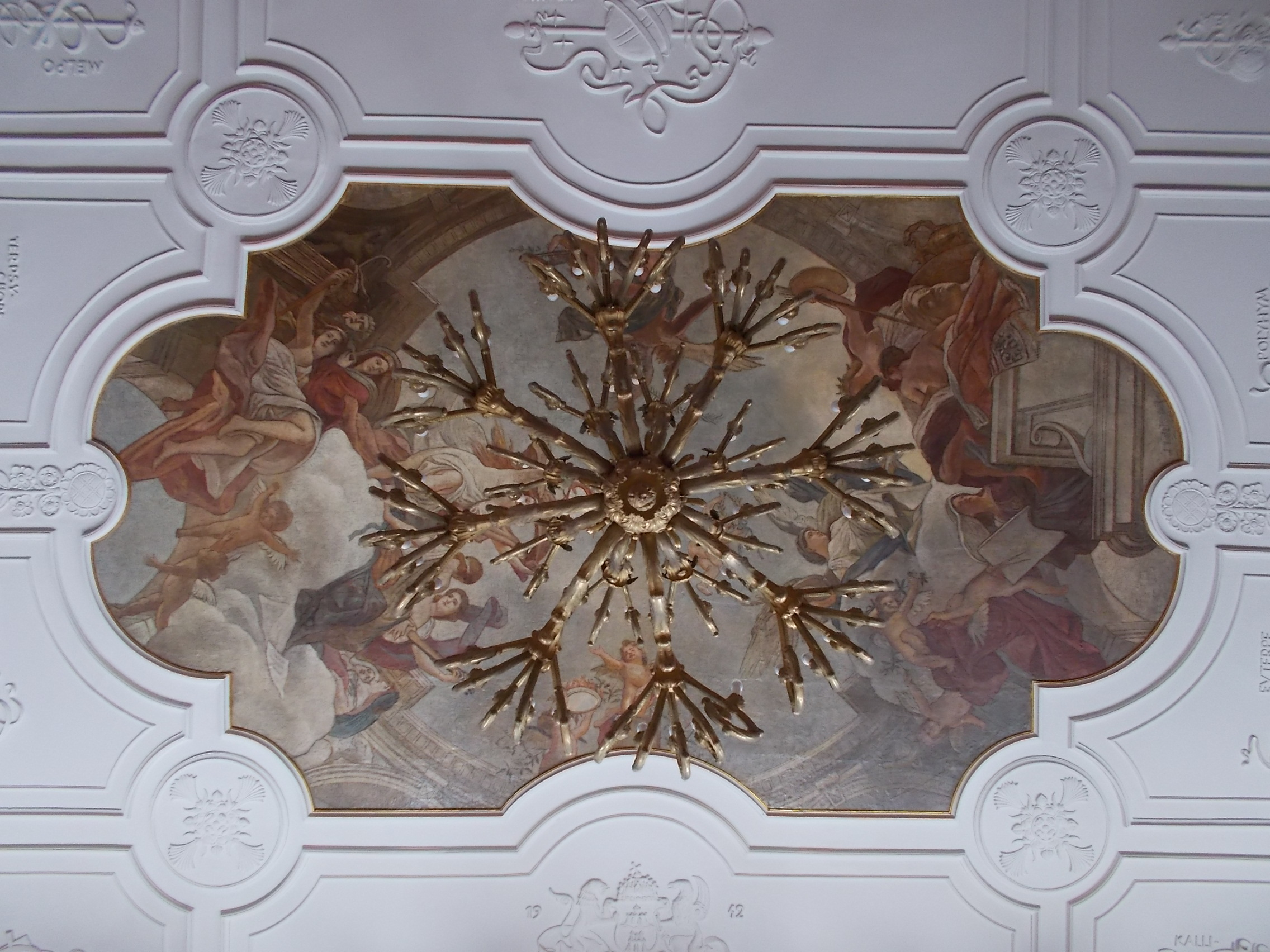
Ceiling mural in the Lotz Salon

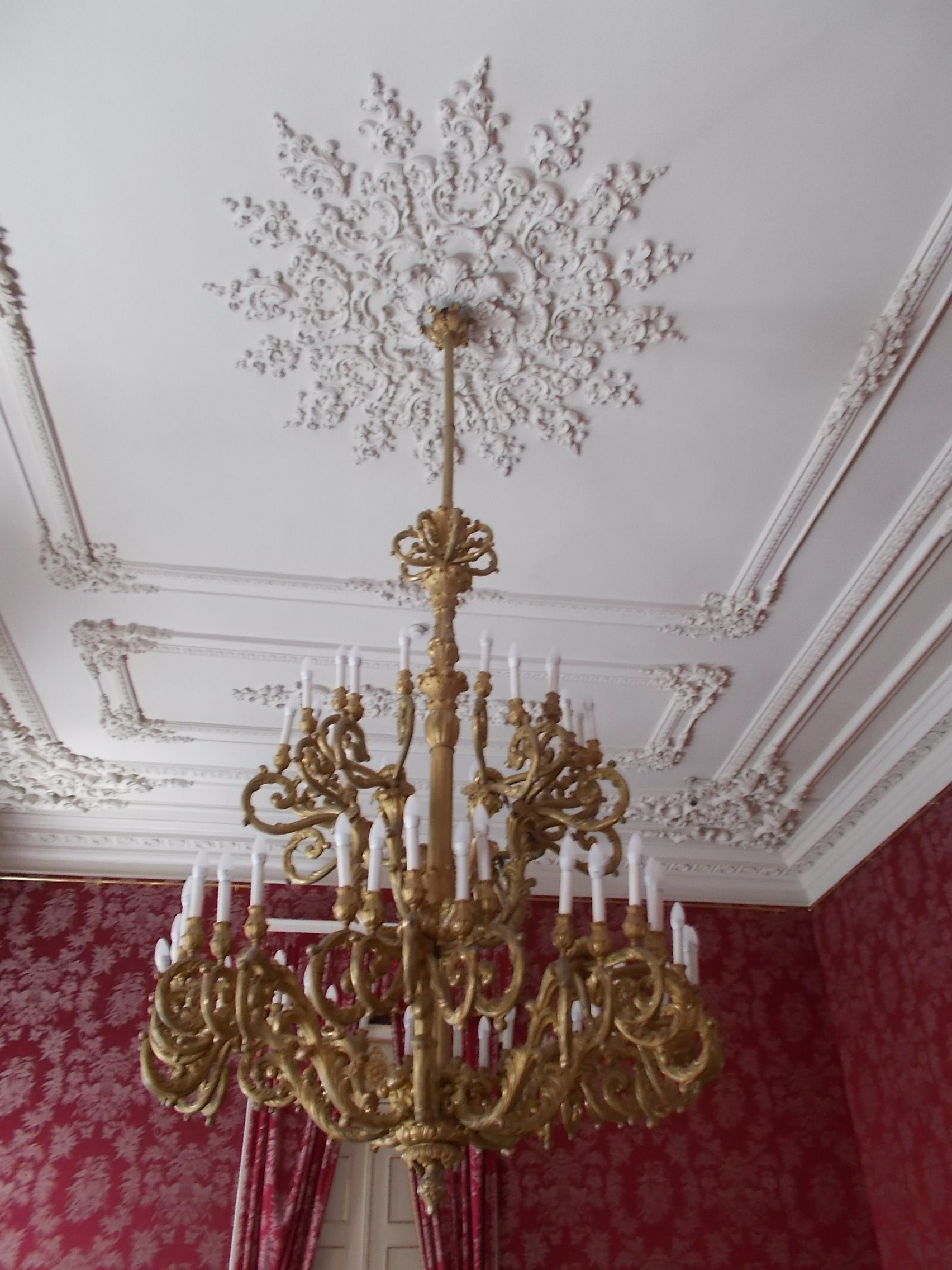
Chandelier, Red Salon

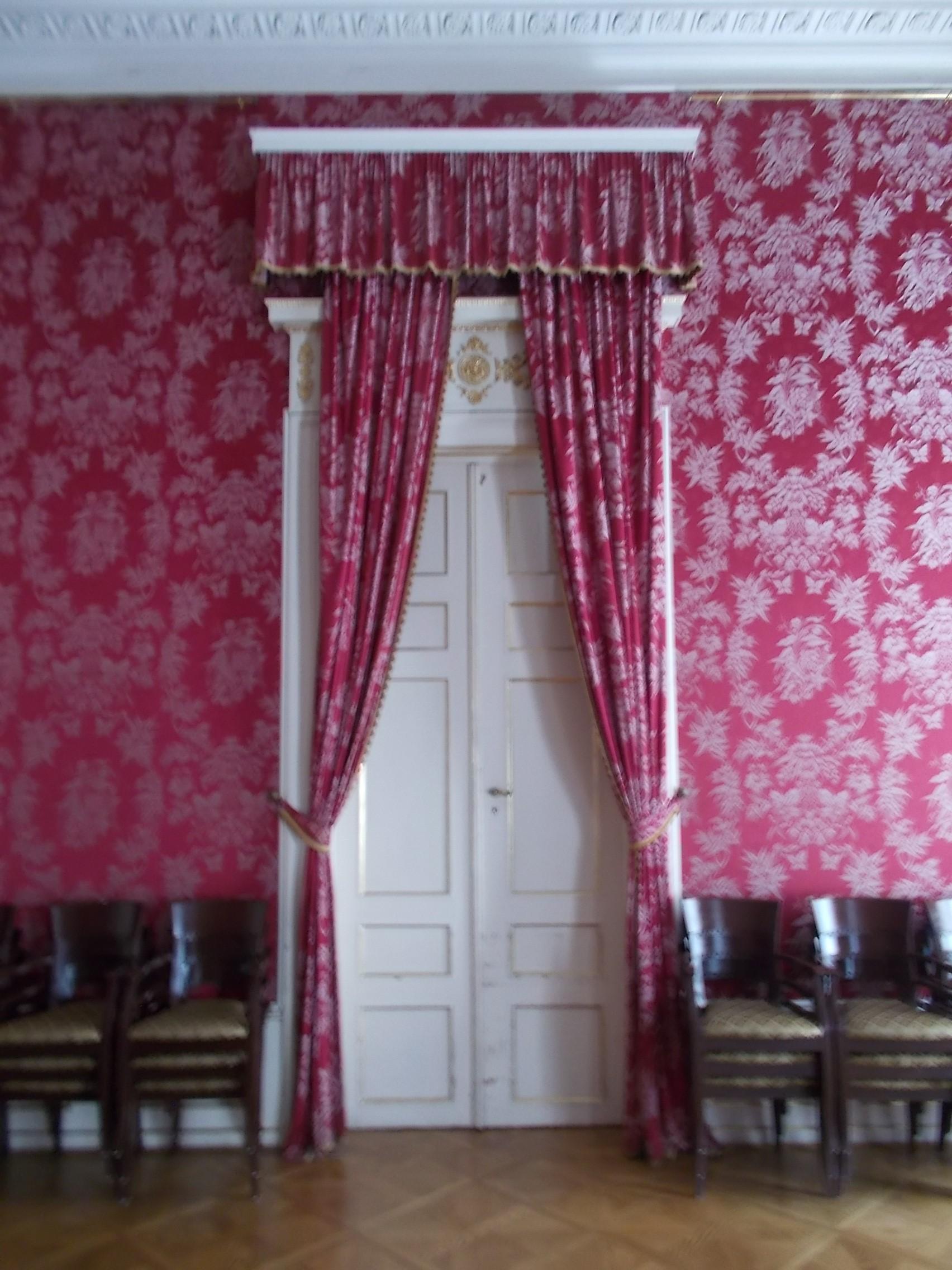
Red Salon

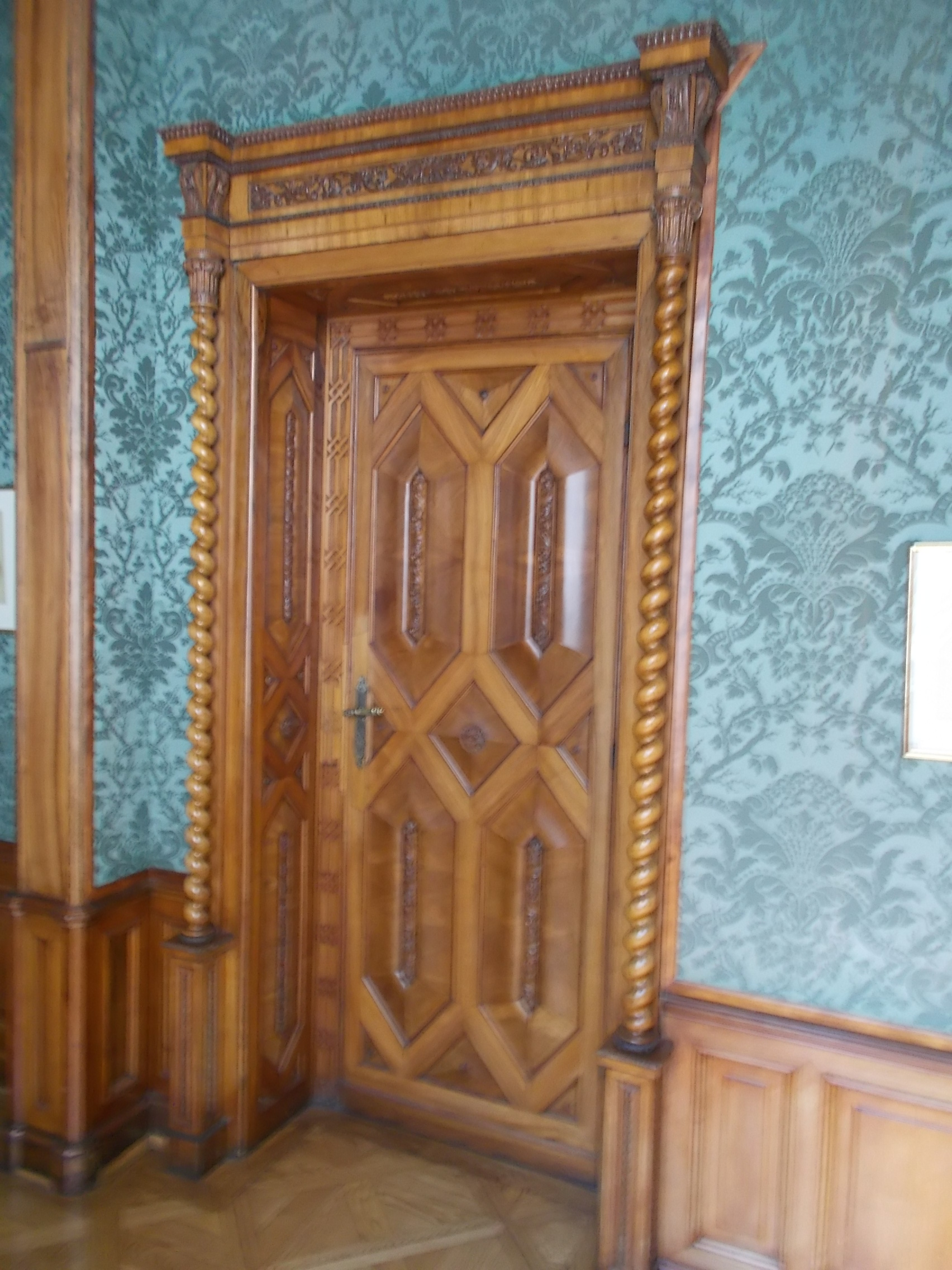
Chapel door
