= Petőfi Literary Museum =

Museum in Budapest, Hungary

- Petőfi Irodalmi Múzeum
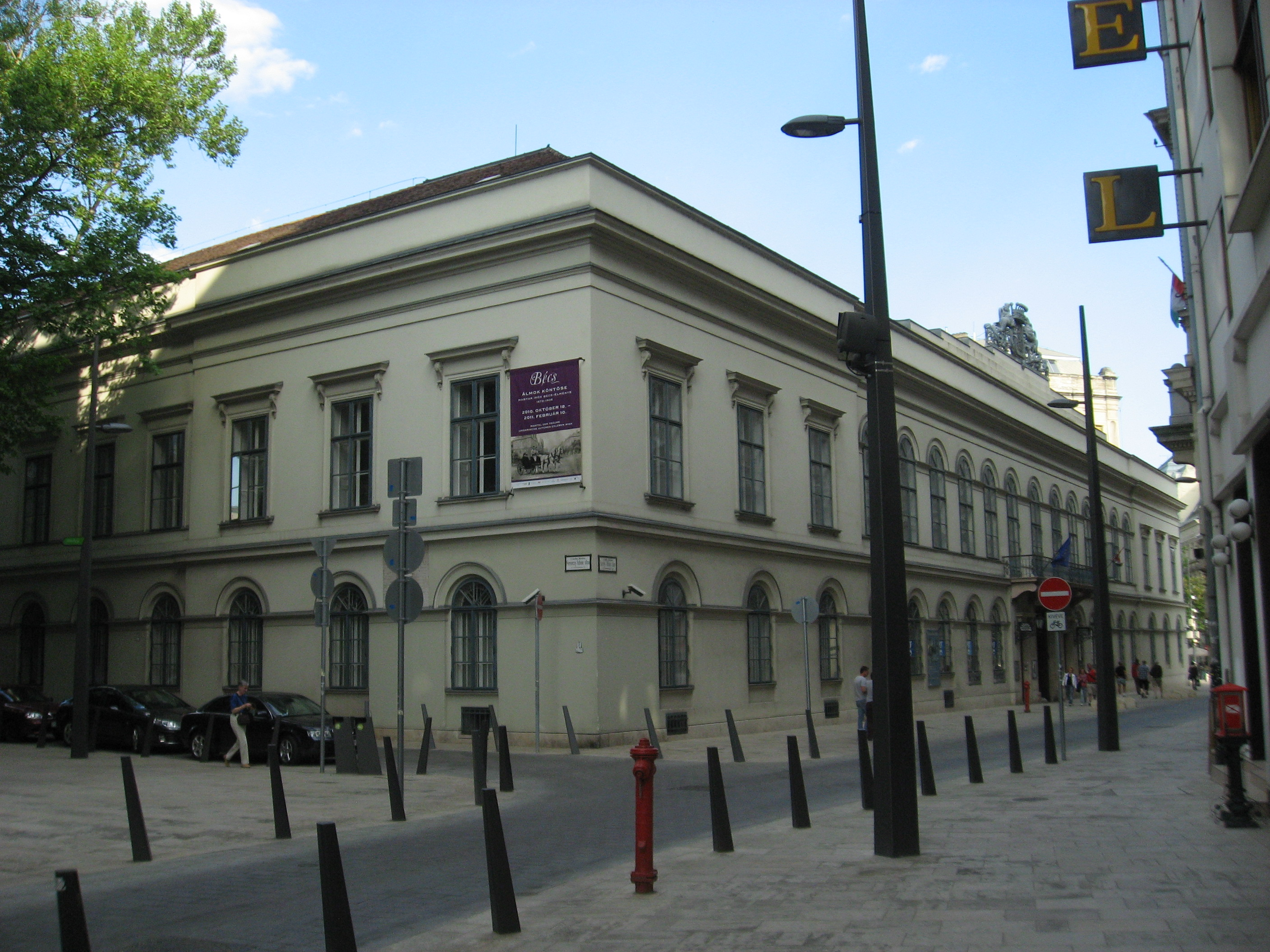
- Károlyi Palace, corner of Károlyi Mihály utca and Ferenczy István utca
- Interactive fullscreen map
- Established: 1954
- Location: 1053 Budapest Károlyi utca 16.
- Coordinates: 47°29′30″N 19°03′30″E
- Website: pim.hu/en

The Petőfi Literary Museum (PLM) is a major Hungarian museum in Budapest. It was founded in 1954, as the successor organisation to Petőfi House and, today, is housed in the former Károlyi Palace. It was named to honour the memory of Sándor Petőfi.
