= Eastern Front (World War II) =

Theatre of war in Europe

- Part of the European theatre of World War II
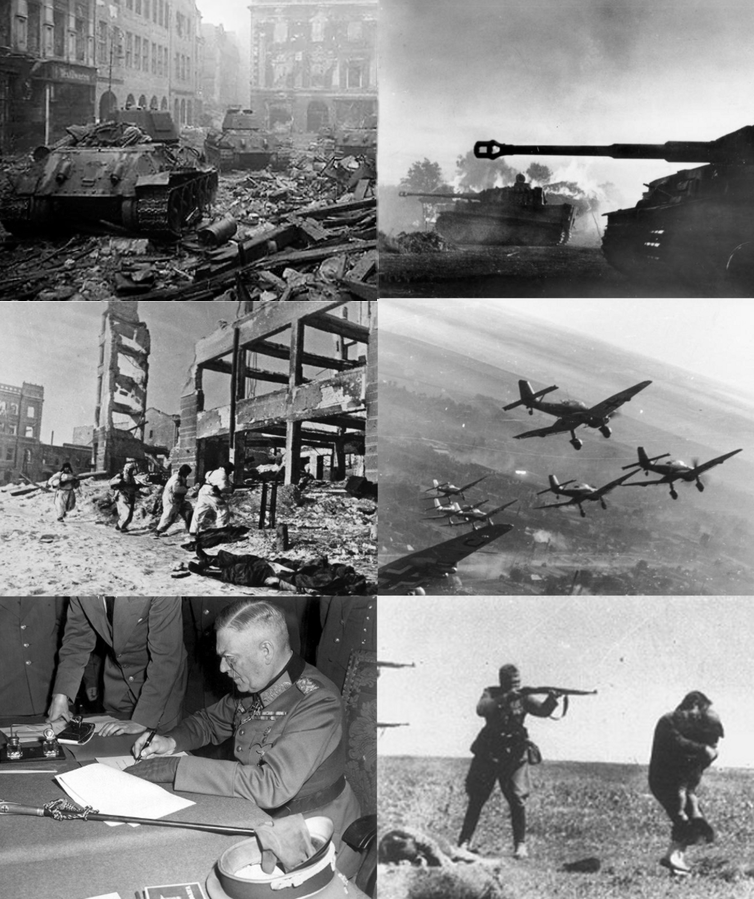
- Clockwise from top left: Soviet T-34 tanks storming Poznań, 1945; German Tiger I tanks during the Battle of Kursk, 1943; German Stuka dive bombers on the Eastern Front, 1943; German Einsatzgruppen death squad murdering Jews in Ukraine, 1942; Wilhelm Keitel signing the German Instrument of Surrender, 1945; Soviet troops at the Battle of Stalingrad, 1943
Date	22 June 1941 – 8 May 1945 (3 years, 10 months, 2 weeks and 2 days)
Location	Europe, east of Germany: Central and Eastern Europe, in later stages: Germany and Austria
Result	Soviet victory (Note: As part of the Allied victory in the European theatre of World War II)
Territorial changes	Soviet occupation of Central and Eastern Europe: Allied occupation of Germany, Austria and Partition of Germany; Polish satellite state and change of borders; Soviet occupation of Romania; Soviet occupation of Hungary; Bulgarian communist coup and Soviet occupation; Soviet re-occupation of the Baltics; Finland cedes Petsamo; Czechoslovakia cedes Carpathian Ruthenia; East Prussia split between the Soviet Union (Kaliningrad Oblast) and Poland (Warmian-Masurian Voivodeship)

Belligerents
Axis: Germany (Note: Foreign volunteers made up a portion of the Wehrmacht, including the Spanish Blue Division, French Legion of French Volunteers Against Bolshevism, and Swiss Medical Mission.); Italy (until 1943); Romania (until 1944); Hungary (Note: Hungary voluntarily participated in the conflict until March 1944, when it submitted to German occupation. In October the same year, a puppet government was installed, which ensured Hungary's participation until the end of the conflict.); Finland (until 1944); Puppet states: Slovakia; Croatia (Note: Croatia never declared war on the Soviet Union and did not consider itself at war with it and only recruited volunteers to the Croatian legions of German and Italian armies (like the Croatian regiment of the Wehrmacht) and the Luftwaffe.)	Allies: Soviet Union; Poland (Note: The so-called "Anders' Army" (under Władysław Anders), composed of Poles in the USSR and loyal to the London-based Polish government-in-exile, was formed in the early stages of the war, but shortly thereafter moved to the West through Iran. After diplomatic relations between the Polish government and the Soviet Union broke down in 1943, a pro-communist Polish division was formed, which would grow into the First and later Second Polish Armies that fought as part of the Soviet Red Army. Political leadership came from the Polish Committee of National Liberation, which evolved into a Provisional Government rivaling the one in London.) (from 1943); Czechoslovakia (Note: A battalion composed of Czechs and Slovaks in the Soviet Union (refugees, defectors, part of the ethnic minority in the USSR) was established in 1942 and was sent at the front in 1943 and would eventually grow to a Czechoslovak Army Corps, loyal to the Czechoslovak government-in-exile in London, which fought as part of the Red Army.) (from 1943); Yugoslavia (Note: In 1943, the USSR began forming Yugoslav units of the Red Army which began operating in 1944; while for the most part Yugoslav troops fought in the Balkans, a number of Red Army operations involving Yugoslav troops took place in Eastern Europe on the general Eastern Front (e.g. Second Jassy–Kishinev offensive, Operation Spring Awakening)) (from 1944); Mongolia (Note: 300 Mongolian soldiers served alongside Soviet soldiers fighting German forces on the Eastern Front. Mongolia also provided large amounts of financial and material aid including horses and supplies to make tanks and aircraft); Tuva (Note: The Tuvan People's Republic sent 11 tank crew members and 208 cavalrymen to volunteer within the Soviet Army. Most of these volunteers were sent to fight in Ukraine.) (1943–1944); Former Axis powers: Romania (from 1944); Bulgaria (from 1944); Finland (from 1944); Hungary (Note: By the beginning of 1945, Hungary had had two rivalling governments, the Hungarist puppet government in the Nazi-occupied territory, and the Debrecen government in the Soviet-occupied territory; in January 1945, the USSR began forming small Hungarian volunteer units loyal to the Debrecen government, the largest of which was the Volunteer Regiment of Buda.) (1945)

Commanders and leaders
Axis leaders: Adolf Hitler ‡‡; Wilhelm Keitel; Alfred Jodl; Walther von Brauchitsch; Franz Halder; Kurt Zeitzler; Hermann Göring; Hans Jeschonnek; Wilhelm von Leeb; Fedor von Bock; Gerd von Rundstedt; Günther von Kluge; Georg von Küchler; Wilhelm List; Maximilian von Weichs; Ewald von Kleist; Erich von Manstein; Ernst Busch; Walter Model; Johannes Friessner; Georg Lindemann; Ferdinand Schörner; Lothar Rendulic; Heinrich Himmler; Erich Raeder; Karl Dönitz; Benito Mussolini (executed); Italo Gariboldi; Enrico Pezzi †; Paolo Tarnassi †; Giovanni Messe; Ion Antonescu; Constantin Pantazi; Iosif Iacobici; Ilie Șteflea; Petre Dumitrescu; Horia Macellariu; Miklós Horthy; Ferenc Szálasi; Ferenc Szombathelyi; Károly Beregfy; Risto Ryti; C.G.E. Mannerheim; Aksel Airo; Eero Rahola; Jozef Tiso; Ferdinand Čatloš; Augustín Malár	Allied leaders: Joseph Stalin; Georgy Zhukov; Boris Shaposhnikov #; Aleksandr Vasilevsky; Aleksei Antonov; Kliment Voroshilov; Semyon Timoshenko; Semyon Budyonny; Pavel Zhigarev; Alexander Novikov; Sergei Khudyakov; Fedor Falaleyev; Semyon Zhavoronkov; Markian Popov; Fyodor Kuznetsov; (Soviet Union) Dmitry Pavlov (executed); Mikhail Kirponos †; Ivan Tyulenev; Andrey Yeremenko; Pavel Kurochkin; Ivan Konev; Yakov Cherevichenko; Rodion Malinovsky; Kiril Meretskov; Filipp Golikov; Konstantin Rokossovsky; Leonid Govorov; Nikolai Vatutin †; Maksim Purkayev; Vasily Sokolovsky; Fyodor Tolbukhin; Ivan Petrov; Ivan Bagramyan; Ivan Chernyakhovsky †; Lavrentiy Beria; Nikolai Kuznetsov; Ivan Isakov; Bolesław Bierut; Michał Rola-Żymierski; Zygmunt Berling; Michael I; Constantin Sănătescu; Nicolae Rădescu; Gheorghe Mihail; Kimon Georgiev; Ivan Marinov; C.G.E. Mannerheim

Strength
1941 3,767,000 troops; 1942 3,720,000 troops; 1943 3,933,000 troops; 1944 3,370,000 troops; 1945 1,960,000 troops	1941 (Front) 2,680,000 troops; 1942 (Front) 5,313,000 troops; 1943 (Front) 6,724,000 troops; 1944 6,800,000 troops; 1945 6,410,000 troops

Casualties and losses
Total: 5.1 million dead: 4.5 million killed or missing in action; 600,000 died in captivity; 4.5 million captured See below.	Total: 8.7–10 million dead: 6.5–6.7 million killed or missing in action; 2.2–3.3 million died in captivity; 4.1 million captured See below.
- Civilian casualties: 18–24 million civilians dead See below.

The Eastern Front, also known as the Great Patriotic War, (Note: Russian: Вели́кая Оте́чественная война́, romanized: Velíkaya Otéchestvennaya voyná) or the German–Soviet War, (Note: German: Deutsch-Sowjetischer Krieg; Ukrainian: Німе́цько-радя́нська війна́, romanized: Niméts'ko-radiáns'ka viiná) was a theatre of World War II fought between the European Axis powers and Allies, including the Soviet Union (USSR) and Poland. It encompassed Central Europe, Eastern Europe, Northeast Europe (Baltics), and Southeast Europe (Balkans), and lasted from 22 June 1941 to 9 May 1945. Of the estimated 70–85 million deaths attributed to the war, around 30 million occurred on the Eastern Front, including 9 million children. (Note: According to Krivosheev 1997, in the Eastern Front, Axis countries and German co-belligerents sustained 1,468,145 irrecoverable losses (668,163 KIA/MIA), Germany itself– 7,181,100 (3,604,800 KIA/MIA), and 579,900 PoWs died in Soviet captivity. So the Axis KIA/MIA amounted to 4.8 million in the East during the period of 1941–1945. This is more than a half of all Axis losses (including the Asia/Pacific theatre). The USSR sustained 10.5 million military losses (including PoWs who died in German captivity, according to Vadim Erlikman. Poteri narodonaseleniia v XX veke : spravochnik. Moscow 2004. ISBN 5-93165-107-1), so the number of military deaths (the USSR and the Axis) amounted to 15 million, far greater than in all other World War II theatres. According to the same source, total Soviet civilian deaths within post-war borders amounted to 15.7 million. The numbers for other Central European and German civilian casualties are not included here.) The Eastern Front was decisive in determining the outcome in the European theatre of operations in World War II and is the main cause of the defeat of Nazi Germany and the Axis nations. Historian Geoffrey Roberts noted that "more than 80 percent of all combat during the Second World War took place on the Eastern Front".

The Axis forces, led by Germany, invaded the Soviet Union in Operation Barbarossa on 22 June 1941. Despite warnings and the deployment of Axis armies on his borders, Stalin refused to believe that Hitler would invade and forbade any defensive preparations as to not provoke possible German retaliation. Thus, the Soviets were caught completely unprepared. They were unable to halt deep Axis advances into Russia, which came close to seizing Moscow. However, the Axis offensive stalled and failed to capture the city, and Hitler shifted his focus to the oil fields of the Caucasus the following year. German forces advanced into the Caucasus under Fall Blau ("Case Blue"), launched on 28 June 1942. The Soviets decisively defeated the Axis at the Battle of Stalingrad—the bloodiest battle in the war and arguably in all of human history—making it one of the key turning points of the front. A second great Axis defeat, at the Battle of Kursk, crippled German offensive capabilities permanently and cleared the way for Soviet offensives. Following the Red Army's enormous success in Operation Bagration, when they destroyed Germany's Army Group Center, several Axis allies defected to the Communists, such as Romania and Bulgaria. The Eastern Front concluded with the capture of Berlin, followed by the signing of the German Instrument of Surrender on 8 May, ending the Eastern Front and the war in Europe.

The battles on the Eastern Front constituted the largest military confrontation in history. In pursuit of its "Lebensraum" settler-colonial agenda, Nazi Germany waged a war of annihilation (Vernichtungskrieg) throughout Eastern Europe. Nazi military operations were characterised by brutality, scorched earth tactics, wanton destruction, mass deportations, starvation, wholesale terrorism, and massacres. These included the genocidal campaigns of Generalplan Ost and the Hunger Plan, which sought the extermination and ethnic cleansing of more than a hundred million Eastern Europeans.

German historian Ernst Nolte called the Eastern Front "the most atrocious war of conquest, enslavement, and annihilation known to modern history", while British historian Robin Cross expressed that "In the Second World War no theatre was more gruelling and destructive than the Eastern Front, and nowhere was the fighting more bitter".

The two principal belligerent powers in the Eastern Front were Germany and the Soviet Union, along with their respective allies. Though they never sent ground troops to the Eastern Front, the United States and the United Kingdom both provided substantial material aid to the Soviet Union in the form of the Lend-Lease program, along with naval and air support.

The joint German–Finnish operations across the northernmost Finnish–Soviet border and in the Murmansk region are considered part of the Eastern Front. In addition, the Soviet–Finnish Continuation War is generally also considered the northern flank of the Eastern Front.

== Background ==
The German Empire was defeated in World War I (1914–1918). The Russian Empire and the subsequent Russian Republic belonged to the victorious bloc of the Allies, but following the October Revolution in Russia, the Bolshevik government signed the separate Treaty of Brest-Litovsk (March 1918), therefore violating its agreement with the other two members of the Triple Entente and breaking the alliance. The Bolsheviks also issued the Declaration of the Rights of the Peoples of Russia, which formally provided the peoples of the former Russian Empire the right to self-determination, including secession and creation of separate states; Russia had lost substantial territory in Eastern Europe as a result of the treaty, where the Bolsheviks in Petrograd conceded to German demands and ceded control of Poland, Lithuania, Estonia, Latvia, Finland, and other areas, to the Central Powers. Subsequently, when Germany in its turn surrendered to the Allies (November 1918) and these territories became independent states under the terms of the Paris Peace Conference of 1919 at Versailles, Soviet Russia was in the midst of a civil war, and the Allies did not recognise the Bolshevik government and supported White governments of Russia, so no Soviet Russian representation attended.

Adolf Hitler had declared his intention to invade the Soviet Union on 11 August 1939 to Carl Jacob Burckhardt, League of Nations Commissioner, by saying:

Everything I undertake is directed against the Russians. If the West is too stupid and blind to grasp this, then I shall be compelled to come to an agreement with the Russians, beat the West and then after their defeat turn against the Soviet Union with all my forces. I need the Ukraine so that they can't starve us out, as happened in the last war.

The Molotov–Ribbentrop Pact signed in August 1939 was a non-aggression agreement between Germany and the Soviet Union. It contained a secret protocol aiming to return Central Europe to the pre–World War I status quo by dividing it between Germany and the Soviet Union. Finland, Estonia, Latvia and Lithuania would return to the Soviet control, while Poland and Romania would be divided. The Eastern Front was also made possible by the German–Soviet Border and Commercial Agreement in which the Soviet Union gave Germany the resources necessary to launch military operations in Eastern Europe.

On 1 September 1939, Germany invaded Poland, starting World War II. On 17 September, the Soviet Union invaded Eastern Poland, and, as a result, Poland was partitioned among Germany, the Soviet Union and Lithuania. Soon after that, the Soviet Union demanded significant territorial concessions from Finland, and after Finland rejected Soviet demands, the Soviet Union attacked Finland on 30 November 1939 in what became known as the Winter War – a bitter conflict that resulted in a peace treaty on 13 March 1940, with Finland maintaining its independence but losing its eastern parts in Karelia.

In June 1940, the Soviet Union occupied and illegally annexed the three Baltic states (Estonia, Latvia and Lithuania). The Molotov–Ribbentrop Pact ostensibly provided security to the Soviets in the occupation both of the Baltics and of the north and northeastern regions of Romania (Northern Bukovina and Bessarabia, June–July 1940), although Hitler, in announcing the invasion of the Soviet Union, cited the Soviet annexations of Baltic and Romanian territory as having violated Germany's understanding of the pact. Moscow partitioned the annexed Romanian territory between the Ukrainian and Moldavian Soviet Socialist Republics.

== Ideologies ==
=== German ideology ===
Hitler had argued in his autobiography Mein Kampf (1925) for the necessity of Lebensraum ("living space"): acquiring new territory for Germans in Eastern Europe, in particular Russia. (Note: "We National Socialists consciously draw a line under the direction of our foreign policy war. We begin where we ended six centuries ago. We stop the perpetual Germanic march towards the south and west of Europe, and have the view on the country in the east. We finally put the colonial and commercial policy of the pre-war and go over to the territorial policy of the future. But if we speak today in Europe of new land, we can primarily only to Russia and the border states subjects him think.") He envisaged settling Germans there, as according to Nazi ideology the Germanic people constituted the "master race", while exterminating or deporting most of the existing inhabitants to Siberia and using the remainder as slave labour. Hitler as early as 1917 had referred to the Russians as inferior, believing that the Bolshevik Revolution had put the Jews in power over the mass of Slavs, who were, in Hitler's opinion, incapable of ruling themselves and had thus ended up being ruled by Jewish masters.

The Nazi leadership, including Heinrich Himmler, saw the war against the Soviet Union as a struggle between the ideologies of Nazism and Jewish Bolshevism, ensuring territorial expansion for the Germanic Übermenschen (superhumans) - who according to Nazi ideology were the Aryan Herrenvolk ("master race") - at the expense of the Slavic Untermenschen (subhumans). Wehrmacht officers told their troops to target people who were described as "Jewish Bolshevik subhumans", the "Mongol hordes", the "Asiatic flood" and the "red beast". The vast majority of German soldiers viewed the war in Nazi terms, seeing the Soviet enemy as subhuman.

Hitler referred to the war in radical terms, calling it a "war of annihilation" (German: Vernichtungskrieg) which was both an ideological and racial war. The Nazi vision for the future of Eastern Europe was codified most clearly in the Generalplan Ost. The populations of occupied Central Europe and the Soviet Union were to be partially deported to West Siberia, enslaved and eventually exterminated; the conquered territories were to be colonised by German or "Germanized" settlers. In addition, the Nazis also sought to rid themselves of the large Jewish population of Central and Eastern Europe as part of their program aiming to exterminate all European Jews.

Psychologically, the German surge to the east in 1941 marked a high point in some Germans' feeling of Ostrausch - an intoxication with the idea of colonising the East.

After Germany's initial success at the Battle of Kiev in 1941, Hitler saw the Soviet Union as militarily weak and ripe for immediate conquest. In a speech at the Berlin Sportpalast on 3 October, he announced, "We have only to kick in the door and the whole rotten structure will come crashing down." Thus the German authorities expected another short Blitzkrieg and made no serious preparations for prolonged warfare. However, following the decisive Soviet victory at the Battle of Stalingrad in 1943 and the resulting dire German military situation, Nazi propaganda began to portray the war as a German defence of Western civilisation against destruction by the vast "Bolshevik hordes" that were pouring into Europe.

=== Soviet situation ===
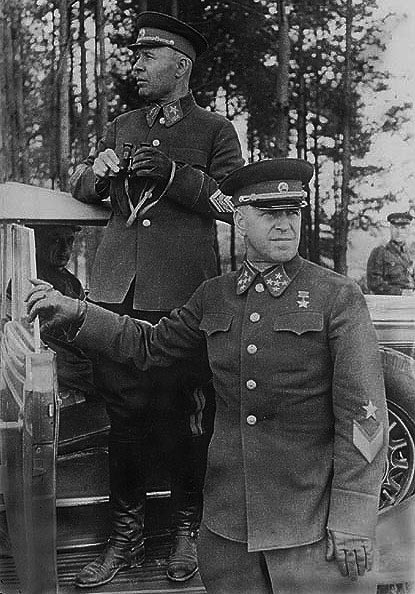
Semyon Timoshenko and Georgy Zhukov in 1940

Throughout the 1930s the Soviet Union underwent massive industrialisation and economic growth under the leadership of Joseph Stalin. Stalin's central tenet, "Socialism in One Country", manifested itself as a series of nationwide centralised five-year plans from 1929 onwards. This represented an ideological shift in Soviet policy, away from its commitment to the international communist revolution, and eventually leading to the dissolution of the Comintern (Third International) organisation in 1943. The Soviet Union started a process of militarisation with the first five-year plan that officially began in 1928, although it was only towards the end of the second five-year plan in the mid-1930s that military power became the primary focus of Soviet industrialisation.

In February 1936 the Spanish general election brought many communist leaders into the Popular Front government in the Second Spanish Republic, but in a matter of months a right-wing military coup initiated the Spanish Civil War of 1936–1939. This conflict soon took on the characteristics of a proxy war involving the Soviet Union and left-wing volunteers from different countries on the side of the predominantly socialist and communist-led Second Spanish Republic; while Nazi Germany, Fascist Italy, and Portugal's Estado Novo took the side of Spanish Nationalists, the military rebel group led by General Francisco Franco. It served as a useful testing ground for both the Wehrmacht and the Red Army to experiment with equipment and tactics that they would later employ on a wider scale in the Second World War.

Nazi Germany, which was an anti-communist régime, formalised its ideological position on 25 November 1936 by signing the Anti-Comintern Pact with the Empire of Japan. Fascist Italy joined the Pact a year later. The Soviet Union negotiated treaties of mutual assistance with France and with Czechoslovakia with the aim of containing Germany's expansion. The German Anschluss of Austria in 1938 and the dismemberment of Czechoslovakia (1938–1939) demonstrated the impossibility of establishing a collective security system in Europe, a policy advocated by the Soviet ministry of foreign affairs under Maxim Litvinov. This, as well as the reluctance of the British and French governments to sign a full-scale anti-German political and military alliance with the USSR, led to the Molotov–Ribbentrop Pact between the Soviet Union and Germany in late August 1939. The separate Tripartite Pact between what became the three prime Axis powers would not be signed until some four years after the Anti-Comintern Pact.

== Forces ==
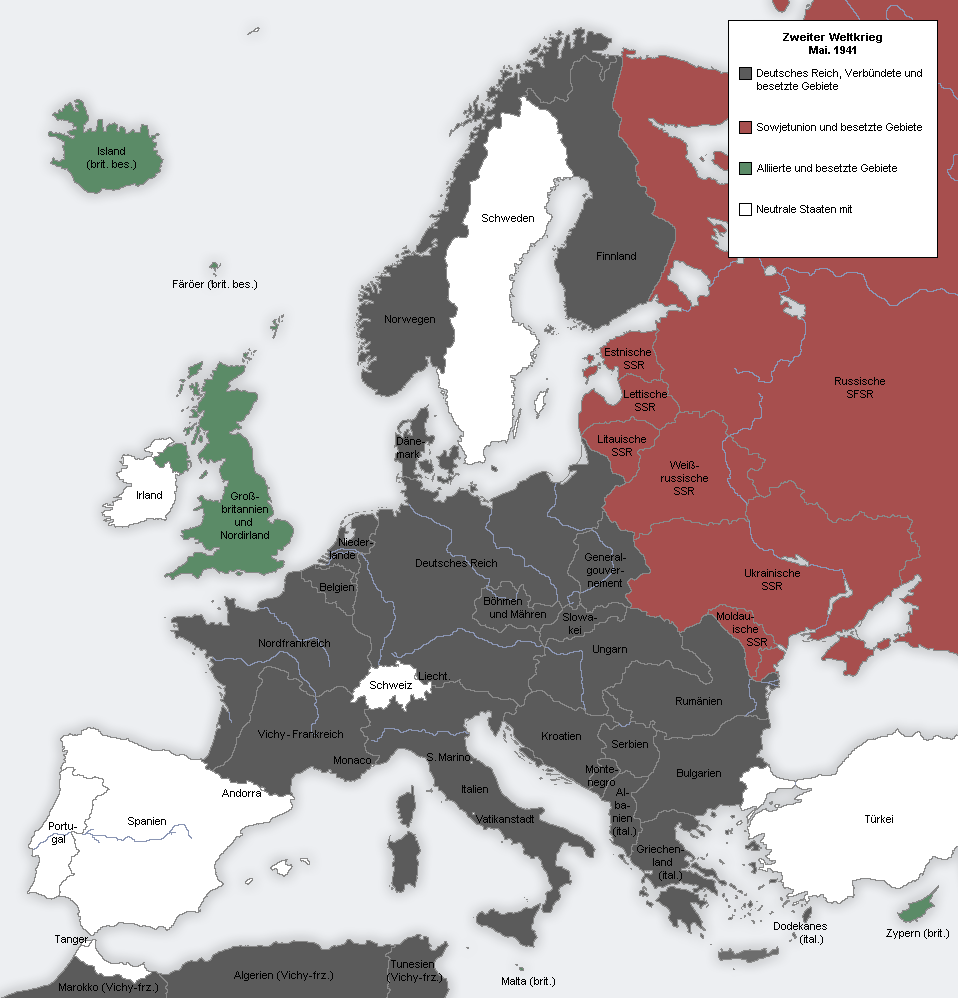
Situation in Europe by May/June 1941, immediately before Operation Barbarossa

The war was fought between Germany, its allies and Finland, against the Soviet Union and its allies. The conflict began on 22 June 1941 with the Operation Barbarossa offensive, when Axis forces crossed the borders described in the German–Soviet Nonaggression Pact, thereby invading the Soviet Union. The war ended on 9 May 1945, when Germany's armed forces surrendered unconditionally following the Battle of Berlin (also known as the Berlin Offensive), a strategic operation executed by the Red Army.

The states that provided forces and other resources for the German war effort included the Axis Powers – primarily Romania, Hungary, Italy, pro-Nazi Slovakia, and Croatia. Anti-Soviet Finland, which had fought the Winter War against the Soviet Union, also joined the offensive. The Wehrmacht forces were also assisted by anti-communist partisans in places like Western Ukraine, and the Baltic states. Among the most prominent volunteer army formations was the Spanish Blue Division, sent by Spanish dictator Francisco Franco to keep his ties to the Axis intact.

The Soviet Union offered support to the anti-Axis partisans in many Wehrmacht-occupied countries in Central Europe, notably those in Slovakia and Poland. In addition, the Polish Armed Forces in the East, particularly the First and Second Polish Armies, were armed and trained, and would eventually fight alongside the Red Army. The Free French Forces also contributed to the Red Army by the formation of the GC3 (Groupe de Chasse 3 or 3rd Fighter Group) unit to fulfil the commitment of Charles de Gaulle, leader of the Free French, who thought that it was important for French servicemen to serve on all fronts.

Comparative strengths of combat forces, Eastern Front, 1941–1945
Date	Axis forces	Soviet forces
22 June 1941	3,050,000 Germans, 67,000 (northern Norway); 500,000 Finns, 150,000 Romanians; Total: 3,767,000 in the east (80% of the German Army)	2,680,000 active in Western Military Districts out of 5,500,000 (overall); 12,000,000 mobilizable reserves
7 June 1942	2,600,000 Germans, 90,000 (northern Norway); 600,000 Romanians, Hungarians, and Italians; Total: 3,720,000 in the east (80% of the German Army)	5,313,000 (front); 383,000 (hospital); Total: 9,350,000
9 July 1943	3,403,000 Germans, 80,000 (northern Norway); 400,000 Finns, 150,000 Romanians and Hungarians; Total: 3,933,000 in the east (63% of the German Army)	6,724,000 (front); 446,445 (hospital); Total: 10,300,000
1 May 1944	2,460,000 Germans, 60,000 (northern Norway); 300,000 Finns, 550,000 Romanians and Hungarians; Total: 3,370,000 in the east (62% of the German Army)	6,425,000
1 January 1945	2,230,000 Germans, 100,000 Hungarians; Total: 2,330,000 in the east (60% of the German Army)	6,532,000 (360,000 Poles, Romanians, Bulgarians, and Czechs)
1 April 1945	1,960,000 Germans; Total: 1,960,000 (66% of the German Army)	6,410,000 (450,000 Poles, Romanians, Bulgarians, and Czechs)

The above figures includes all personnel in the German Army, i.e. active-duty Heer, Waffen SS, Luftwaffe ground forces, personnel of the naval coastal artillery and security units. (Note: For example, my own extensive study of German forces in 1941 (Volume IIA and IIB of 'Operation Barbarossa: the complete Organisational and Statistical Analysis') shows the entire German force on the Eastern Front (up to 4 July 1941) had around 3,359,000 men (page 74, Vol IIB). This includes around 87,600 in the Northern Norway command (Bef. Fin.), and 238,700 in OKH Reserve units (some of which had not yet arrived in the East). It includes all personnel in the German Army (including the security units), Waffen SS, Luftwaffe ground forces and even naval coastal artillery (in the East). This figure compares very well with the figure in the table (around 3,119,000) derived from Earl Ziemke's book (which is used as the Axis source in the chart)Askey, Nigel (30 October 2017). "The Myth of German Superiority on the WW2 Eastern Front" (PDF). operationbarbarossa.net/.) In the spring of 1940, Germany had mobilised 5,500,000 men. By the time of the invasion of the Soviet Union, the Wehrmacht consisted of c. 3,800,000 men of the Heer, 1,680,000 of the Luftwaffe, 404,000 of the Kriegsmarine, 150,000 of the Waffen-SS, and 1,200,000 of the Replacement Army (contained 450,400 active reservists, 550,000 new recruits and 204,000 in administrative services, vigiles and or in convalescence). The Wehrmacht had a total strength of 7,234,000 men by 1941. For Operation Barbarossa, Germany mobilised 3,300,000 troops of the Heer, 150,000 of the Waffen-SS, and approximately 250,000 personnel of the Luftwaffe were actively earmarked.

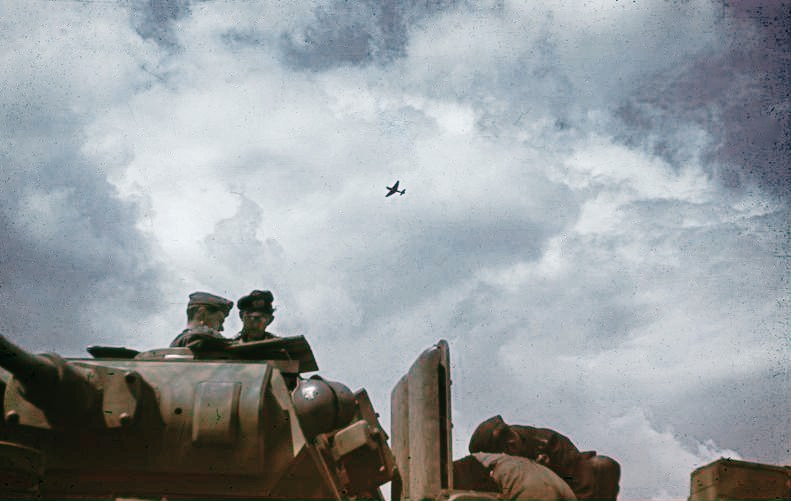
German soldiers in a Panzer III tank; Kalmyk steppe north of Stalingrad, September 1942

By July 1943, the Wehrmacht numbered 6,815,000 troops. Of these, 3,900,000 were deployed in Eastern Europe, 180,000 in Finland, 315,000 in Norway, 110,000 in Denmark, 1,370,000 in Western Europe, 330,000 in Italy, and 610,000 in the Balkans. According to a presentation by Alfred Jodl, the Wehrmacht was up to 7,849,000 personnel in April 1944. 3,878,000 were deployed in Eastern Europe, 311,000 in Norway/Denmark, 1,873,000 in Western Europe, 961,000 in Italy, and 826,000 in the Balkans. About 15–20% of total German strength were foreign troops (from allied countries or conquered territories). The German high water mark was just before the Battle of Kursk, in early July 1943: 3,403,000 German troops and 650,000 Finnish, Hungarian, Romanian, and other countries' troops.

For nearly two years the border was quiet while Germany conquered Denmark, Norway, France, the Low Countries, and the Balkans. Hitler had always intended to renege on his pact with the Soviet Union, eventually making the decision to invade in the spring of 1941.

Some historians say Stalin was fearful of war with Germany, or just did not expect Germany to start a two-front war, and was reluctant to do anything to provoke Hitler. Another viewpoint is that Stalin expected war in 1942 (the time when all his preparations would be complete) and stubbornly refused to believe it would come early.

British historians Alan S. Milward and M. Medlicott show that Nazi Germany—unlike Imperial Germany—was prepared for only a short-term war (Blitzkrieg). According to Edward Ericson, although Germany's own resources were sufficient for the victories in the West in 1940, massive Soviet shipments obtained during a short period of Nazi–Soviet economic collaboration were critical for Germany to launch Operation Barbarossa.

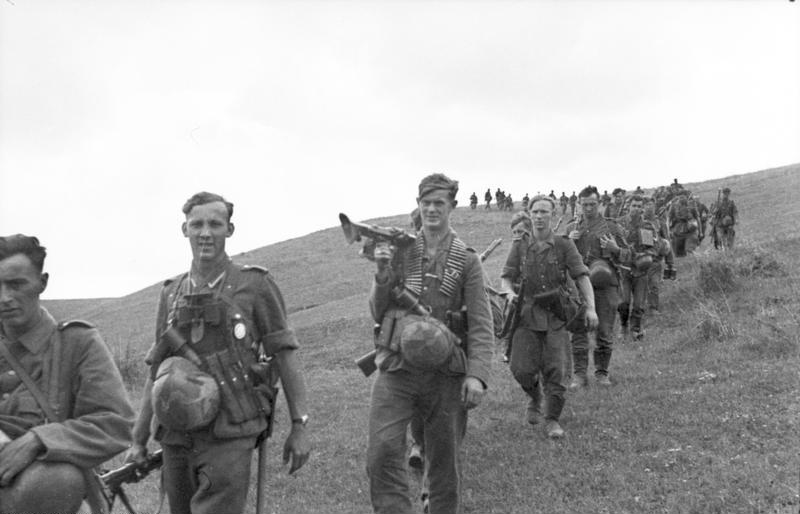
German infantry in Russia, June 1943

Germany had been assembling very large numbers of troops in eastern Poland and making repeated reconnaissance flights over the border; the Soviet Union responded by assembling its divisions on its western border, although the Soviet mobilisation was slower than Germany's due to the country's less dense road network. As in the Sino-Soviet conflict on the Chinese Eastern Railway or Soviet–Japanese border conflicts, Soviet troops on the western border received a directive, signed by Marshal Semyon Timoshenko and General of the Army Georgy Zhukov, that ordered (as demanded by Stalin): "do not answer to any provocations" and "do not undertake any (offensive) actions without specific orders" – which meant that Soviet troops could open fire only on their soil and forbade counterattack on German soil. The German invasion therefore caught the Soviet military and civilian leadership largely by surprise.

The extent of warnings received by Stalin about a German invasion is controversial, and the claim that there was a warning that "Germany will attack on 22 June without declaration of war" has been dismissed as a "popular myth". However, some sources quoted in the articles on Soviet spies Richard Sorge and Willi Lehmann, say they had sent warnings of an attack on 20 or 22 June, which were treated as "disinformation". The Lucy spy ring in Switzerland also sent warnings, possibly deriving from Ultra codebreaking in Britain. Sweden had access to internal German communications through breaking the crypto used in the Siemens and Halske T52 crypto machine also known as the Geheimschreiber and informed Stalin about the forthcoming invasion well ahead of June 22, but did not reveal its sources.

Soviet intelligence was fooled by German disinformation, so sent false alarms to Moscow about a German invasion in April, May and the beginning of June. Soviet intelligence reported that Germany would rather invade the USSR after the fall of the British Empire or after an unacceptable ultimatum demanding German occupation of Ukraine during the German invasion of Britain.

=== Foreign support and measures ===
A strategic air offensive by the United States Army Air Force and Royal Air Force played a significant part in damaging German industry and tying up German air force and air defence resources, with some bombings, such as the bombing of the eastern German city of Dresden, being done to facilitate specific Soviet operational goals. In addition to Germany, hundreds of thousands of tons of bombs were dropped on their eastern allies of Romania and Hungary, primarily in an attempt to cripple Romanian oil production.

British and Commonwealth forces also contributed directly to the fighting on the Eastern Front through their service in the Arctic convoys and training Red Air Force pilots, as well as in the provision of early material and intelligence support.

Allied shipments to the Soviet Union
Year	Amount (tons)	%	
1941	360,778	2	.1
1942	2,453,097	14	
1943	4,794,545	27	.4
1944	6,217,622	35	.5
1945	3,673,819	21	
Total	17,499,861	100	

==== Soviet Union ====
Among other goods, Lend-Lease supplied:

- 58% of the USSR's high octane aviation fuel
- 33% of their motor vehicles
- 53% of USSR domestic production of expended ordnance (artillery shells, mines, assorted explosives)
- 30% of fighters and bombers
- 93% of railway equipment (locomotives, freight cars, wide gauge rails, etc.)
- 50–80% of rolled steel, cable, lead, and aluminium
- 43% of garage facilities (building materials and blueprints)
- 12% of tanks and SPGs
- 50% of TNT (1942–1944) and 33% of ammunition powder (in 1944) (Note: "In 1944, we received about one third of the ammunition powder from the Lend-Lease. Almost half of TNT (the main explosive filler for most kinds of ammunition) or raw materials for its production came from abroad in 1942–44.)
- 16% of all explosives (From 1941 to 1945, the USSR produced 505,000 tons of explosives and received 105,000 tons of Lend-Lease imports.)

Lend-Lease aid of military hardware, components and goods to the Soviet Union constituted to 20% percent of the assistance. The rest were foodstuff, nonferrous metals (e.g., copper, magnesium, nickel, zinc, lead, tin, aluminium), chemical substances, petroleum (high octane aviation gasoline), and factory machinery. The aid of production-line equipment and machinery were crucial and helped to maintain adequate levels of Soviet armament production during the entire war. In addition, the USSR received wartime innovations including penicillin, radar, rocket, precision-bombing technology, the long-range navigation system Loran, and many other innovations.

Of the 800,000 tons of nonferrous metals shipped, about 350,000 tons were aluminium. The shipment of aluminium not only represented double the amount of metal that Germany possessed, but also composed the bulk of aluminium that was used in manufacture of Soviet aircraft, that had fallen in critically short supply. Soviet statistics show that without these shipments of aluminium, aircraft production would have been less than one-half (about 68,500) of the total 137,000 produced aircraft.

Stalin noted in 1944 that two-thirds of Soviet heavy industry had been built with the help of the United States, and the remaining one-third, with the help from other Western nations such as Great Britain and Canada. The massive transfer of equipment and skilled personnel from occupied territories helped further to boost the economic base. Without Lend-Lease aid, Soviet Union's diminished post invasion economic base would not have produced adequate supplies of weaponry, other than focus on machine tool, foodstuff and consumer goods.

In the last year of war, Lend-Lease data show that about 5.1 million tons of foodstuff left the United States for the Soviet Union. It is estimated that all the food supplies sent to Russia could feed a 12,000,000-man strong army a half pound of concentrated food per day, for the entire duration of the war.

The total Lend-Lease aid provided during the Second World War had been estimated between $42–50 billion. The Soviet Union received shipments in war materials, military equipment and other supplies worth of $12.5 billion, about a quarter of the American Lend-Lease aid provided to other Allied countries. However, post-war negotiations to settle all the debt were never concluded, and as of date, the debt issues is still on in future American-Russian summits and talks.

Prof. Dr. Albert L. Weeks concluded, "As to attempts to sum up the importance of those four-year-long shipments of Lend-Lease for the Russian victory on the Eastern Front in World War II, the jury is still out – that is, in any definitive sense of establishing exactly how crucial this aid was."

==== Nazi Germany ====
Europe at the height of German military expansion, 1942

Germany's economic, scientific, research and industrial capabilities were among the most technically advanced in the world at the time. However, access to (and control of) the resources, raw materials and production capacity required to entertain long-term goals (such as European control, German territorial expansion and the destruction of the USSR) were limited. Political demands necessitated the expansion of Germany's control of natural and human resources, industrial capacity and farmland beyond its borders (conquered territories). Germany's military production was tied to resources outside its area of control, a dynamic not found amongst the Allies.

During the war, as Germany acquired new territories (either by direct annexation or by installing puppet governments in defeated countries), these new territories were forced to sell raw materials and agricultural products to German buyers at extremely low prices. Overall, Vichy France made the largest contribution to the German war effort. Two-thirds of all French trains in 1941 were used to carry goods to Germany. In 1943–44, French payments to Germany may have risen to as much as 55% of French GDP. Norway lost 20% of its national income in 1940 and 40% in 1943. Axis allies such as Romania and Italy, Hungary, Finland, Croatia, and Bulgaria benefited from Germany's net imports. Overall, Germany imported 20% of its food and 33% of its raw materials from conquered territories and Axis allies.

On 27 May 1940, Germany signed the "Oil Pact" with Romania, by which Germany would trade arms for oil. Romania's oil production amounted to approximately 6,000,000 tons annually. This production represents 35% of the total fuel production of the Axis, including synthetic products and substitutes, and 70% of the total production of crude oil. In 1941, Germany only had 18% of the oil it had in peacetime. Romania supplied Germany and its allies with roughly 13 million barrels of oil (about 4 million per year) between 1941 and 1943. Germany's peak oil production in 1944 amounted to about 12 million barrels of oil per year.

Rolf Karlbom estimated that Sweden's share of Germany's total consumption of iron may have amounted to 43% during the period of 1933–43. It may also be likely that "Swedish ore formed the raw material of four out of every ten German guns" during the Hitler era.

=== Forced labour ===
The use of foreign forced labour and slavery in Germany and throughout German-occupied Europe during World War II took place on an unprecedented scale. It was a vital part of the German economic exploitation of conquered territories. It also contributed to the mass extermination of populations in German-occupied Europe. The Germans abducted approximately 12 million foreign people from almost twenty European countries; about two-thirds came from Central and Eastern Europe. Counting deaths and turnover, about 15 million men and women were forced labourers at one point during the war. For example, 1.5 million French soldiers were kept in POW camps in Germany as hostages and forced workers and, in 1943, 600,000 French civilians were forced to move to Germany to work in war plants.

The defeat of Germany in 1945 freed approximately 11 million foreigners (categorised as "displaced persons"), most of whom were forced labourers and POWs. In wartime, the German forces had brought into the Reich 6.5 million civilians in addition to Soviet POWs for unfree labour in factories. In all, 5.2 million foreign workers and POWs were repatriated to the Soviet Union, 1.6 million to Poland, 1.5 million to France, and 900,000 to Italy, along with 300,000 to 400,000 each to Yugoslavia, Czechoslovakia, the Netherlands, Hungary, and Belgium.

== Conduct of operations ==
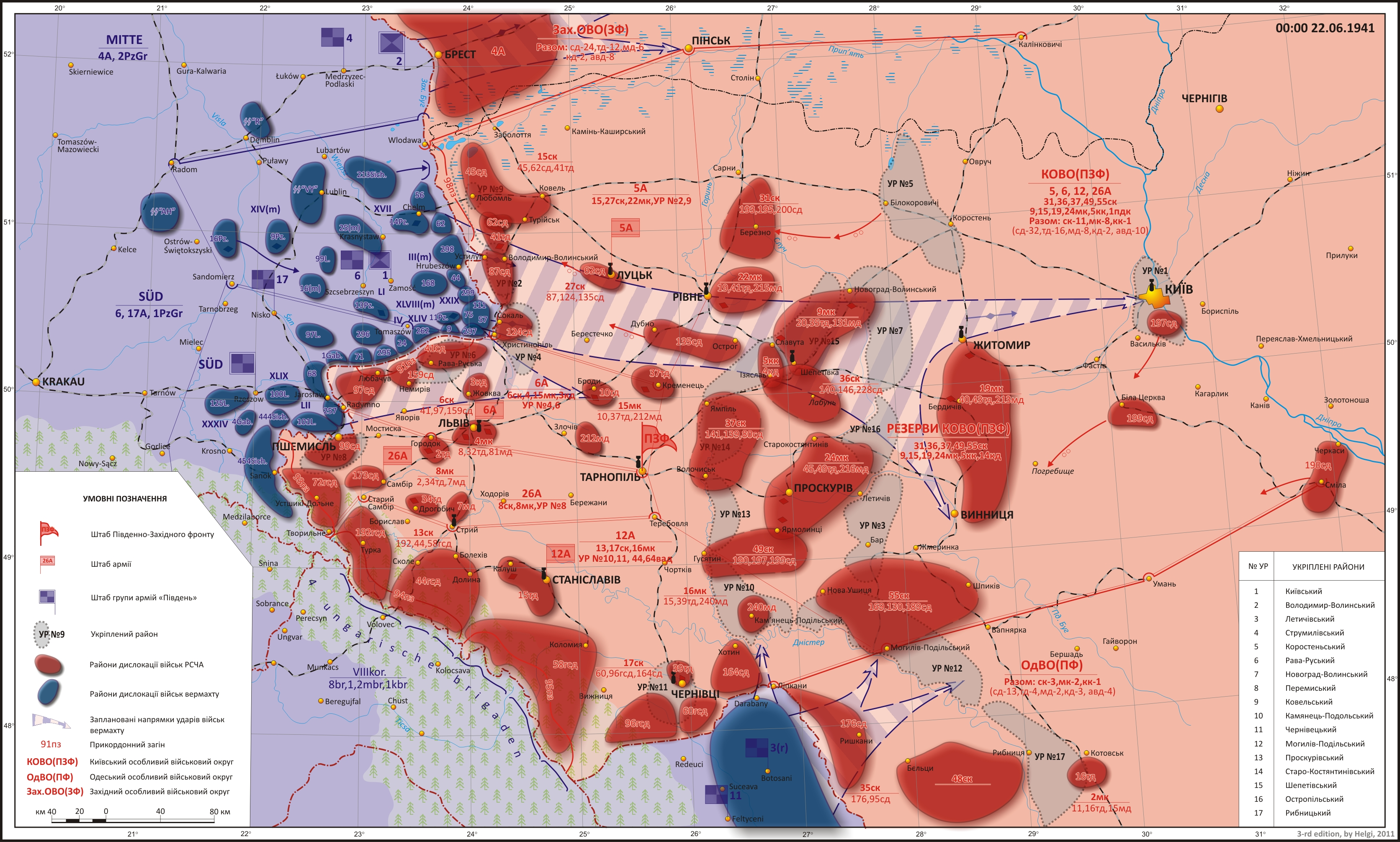
The South Western Front (Ukrainian) on 22 June 1941

While German historians do not apply any specific periodisation to the conduct of operations on the Eastern Front, all Soviet and Russian historians divide the war against Germany and its allies into three periods, which are further subdivided into eight major campaigns of the Theatre of war:

- First period (Russian: Первый период Великой Отечественной войны) (22 June 1941 – 18 November 1942)
1. Summer–Autumn Campaign of 1941 (Russian: Летне-осенняя кампания 1941 г.) (22 June – 4 December 1941)
2. Winter Campaign of 1941–42 (Russian: Зимняя кампания 1941/42 г.) (5 December 1941 – 30 April 1942)
3. Summer–Autumn Campaign of 1942 (Russian: Летне-осенняя кампания 1942 г.) (1 May – 18 November 1942)
- Second period (Russian: Второй период Великой Отечественной войны) (19 November 1942 – 31 December 1943)
1. Winter Campaign of 1942–43 (Russian: Зимняя кампания 1942–1943 гг.) (19 November 1942 – 3 March 1943)
2. Summer–Autumn Campaign of 1943 (Russian: Летне-осенняя кампания 1943 г.) (1 July – 31 December 1943)
- Third period (Russian: Третий период Великой Отечественной войны) (1 January 1944 – 9 May 1945)
1. Winter–Spring Campaign (Russian: Зимне-весенняя кампания 1944 г.) (1 January – 31 May 1944)
2. Summer–Autumn Campaign of 1944 (Russian: Летне-осенняя кампания 1944 г.) (1 June – 31 December 1944)
3. Campaign in Europe during 1945 (Russian: Кампания в Европе 1945 г.) (1 January – 8 May 1945)

=== Operation Barbarossa: Summer 1941 ===
Operation Barbarossa: the German invasion of the Soviet Union, 21 June 1941 to 5 December 1941: to 9 July 1941 to 1 September 1941 to 9 September 1941 to 5 December 1941

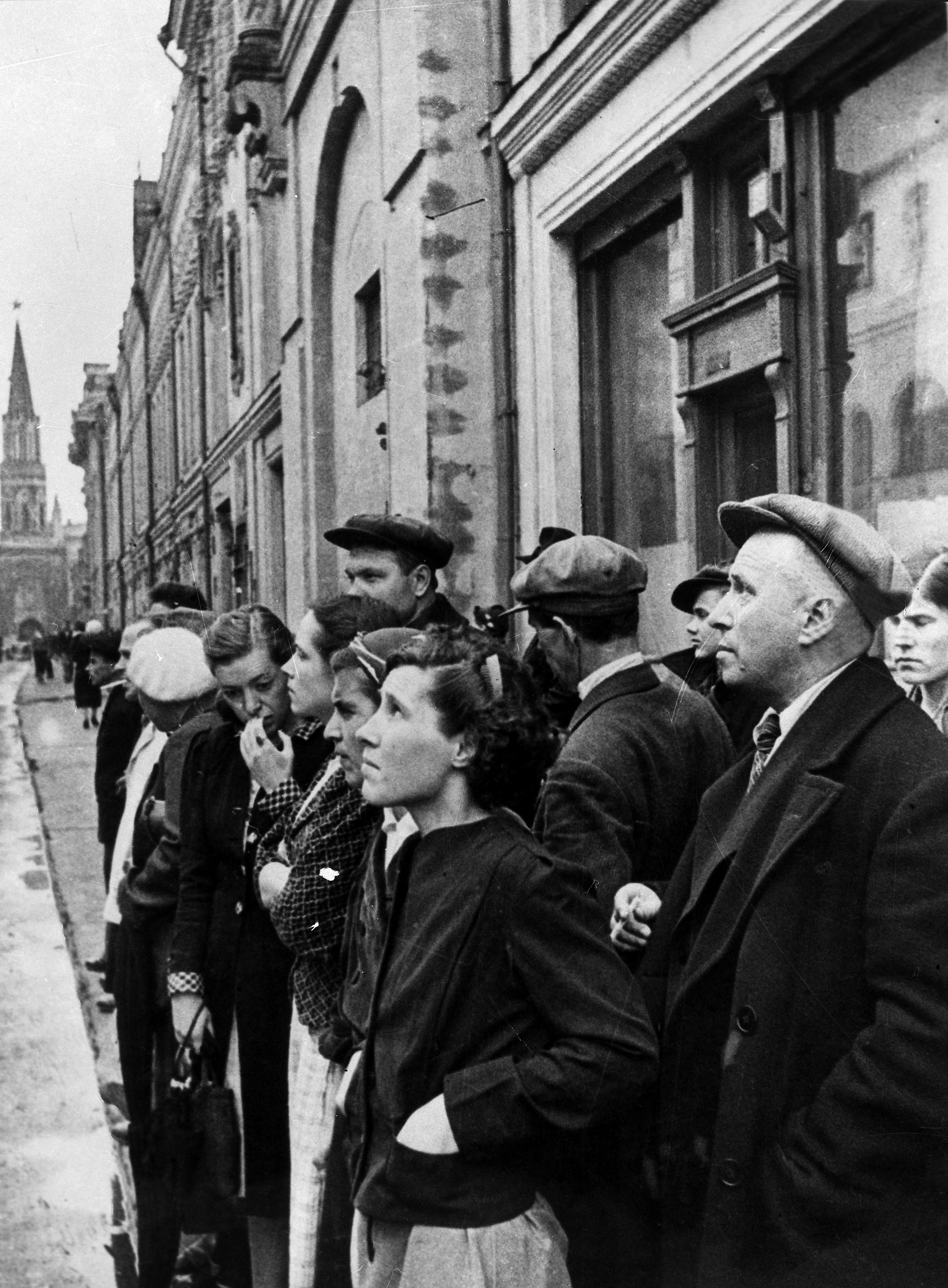
Moscovites gather by a loudspeaker to listen to Vyacheslav Molotov's announcement of the German invasion, 22 June 1941

Operation Barbarossa began just before dawn on 22 June 1941. The Germans severed Red Army communications in Soviet western military districts. The Soviet NKVD had obtained substantial intelligence warning of the attack in advance from sources like Richard Sorge, but this information was not acted on. (Note: Historian Chris Bellamy attributes this mainly to Stalin's judgements, whose behavior he likens to a severe case of "denial".)

At 03:15 on 22 June 1941, 99 of 190 German divisions, including fourteen panzer divisions and ten motorised, were deployed against the Soviet Union from the Baltic to the Black Sea. They were accompanied by ten Romanian divisions, three Italian divisions, two Slovak divisions and nine Romanian and four Hungarian brigades. On the same day, the Baltic, Western, and Kiev Special military districts were renamed the Northwestern, Western, and Southwestern Fronts respectively.

To establish air supremacy, the Luftwaffe began immediate attacks on Soviet airfields, destroying numerous aircraft of the forward-deployed Soviet Air Force, consisting of largely obsolescent types parked on airstrips, before their pilots had a chance to leave the ground. Inexperienced Soviet pilots were decimated by their veteran Luftwaffe counterparts in dogfights, who often flew inferior models to German pilots.

For the first month, the Axis offensive conducted on three axes was completely unstoppable as the panzer forces encircled hundreds of thousands of Soviet troops in huge pockets, which were then reduced and destroyed by slower-moving infantry armies while the panzers continued their rapid advances.

Army Group North's objective was Leningrad via the Baltic states. Comprising the 16th and 18th Armies and the 4th Panzer Group, this formation advanced through the Baltic states, and the Russian Pskov and Novgorod regions. Local insurgents seized the moment and gained control over most of Lithuania, northern Latvia, and southern Estonia prior to the arrival of the German forces.

Army Group Centre's two panzer groups (the 2nd and 3rd), advanced to the north and south of Brest-Litovsk and converged east of Minsk, followed by the 2nd, 4th, and 9th Armies. The combined panzer force reached the Beresina River in just six days, 650 km (400 mi) from their start lines. The next objective was to cross the Dnieper river, which was accomplished by 11 July. Their next target was Smolensk, which fell on 16 July, but fierce Soviet resistance in the Smolensk area and slowing of the Wehrmacht advance by the North and South Army Groups forced Hitler to halt a central thrust at Moscow and to divert the 3rd Panzer Group north. Critically, Guderian's 2nd Panzer Group was ordered to move south in a giant pincer manoeuvre with Army Group South which was advancing into Ukraine. Army Group Centre's infantry divisions were left relatively unsupported by armour to continue their slow advance to Moscow.

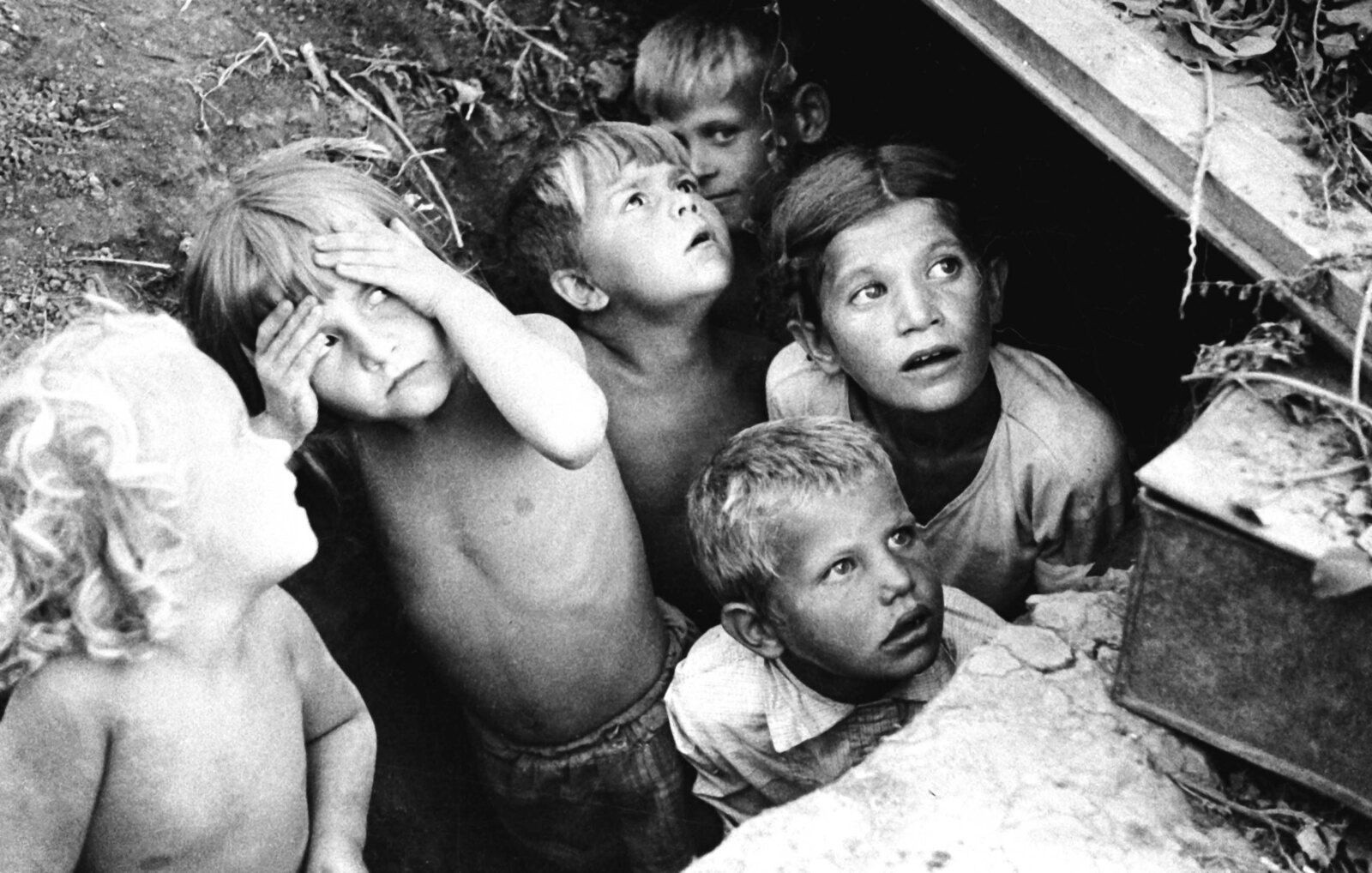
Soviet children during a German air raid in the first days of the war, June 1941, by RIA Novosti archive

This decision caused a severe leadership crisis. The German field commanders argued for an immediate offensive towards Moscow, but Hitler overruled them, citing the importance of Ukrainian agricultural, mining and industrial resources, as well as the massing of Soviet reserves in the Gomel area between Army Group Centre's southern flank and the bogged-down Army Group South's northern flank. This decision, Hitler's "summer pause", is believed to have had a severe impact on the outcome of the Battle of Moscow later in the year, by slowing down the advance on Moscow in favour of encircling large numbers of Soviet troops around Kiev.

Army Group South, with the 1st Panzer Group, the 6th, 11th, and 17th Armies, was tasked with advancing through Galicia and into Ukraine. Their progress, however, was rather slow, and they took heavy casualties in the Battle of Brody. At the beginning of July, the Third and Fourth Romanian Armies, aided by elements of the German 11th Army, fought their way through Bessarabia towards Odessa. The 1st Panzer Group turned away from Kiev for the moment, advancing into the Dnieper bend (western Dnipropetrovsk Oblast). When it joined up with the southern elements of Army Group South at Uman, the Group captured about 100,000 Soviet prisoners in a huge encirclement. Advancing armoured divisions of Army Group South met with Guderian's 2nd Panzer Group near Lokhvytsa on 16 September, cutting off large numbers of Red Army troops in the pocket east of Kiev. 400,000 Soviet prisoners were captured as Kiev was surrendered on 19 September.

On 26 September, the Soviet forces east of Kiev surrendered and the Battle of Kiev ended.

As the Red Army withdrew behind the Dnieper and Dvina rivers, the Soviet Stavka (high command) turned its attention to evacuating as much of the western regions' industry as it could. Factories were dismantled and transported on flatcars away from the front line for re-establishment in more remote areas of the Ural Mountains, Caucasus, Central Asia, and southeastern Siberia. Most civilians were left to make their own way east, with only industry-related workers evacuated with the equipment; much of the population was left behind to the mercy of the invading forces.

Stalin ordered the retreating Red Army to initiate a scorched-earth policy to deny the Germans and their allies basic supplies as they advanced eastward. To carry out that order, destruction battalions were formed in front-line areas, having the authority to summarily execute any suspicious person. The destruction battalions burned down villages, schools, and public buildings. As a part of this policy, the NKVD massacred thousands of anti-Soviet prisoners.

=== Leningrad, Moscow and Rostov: Autumn 1941 ===
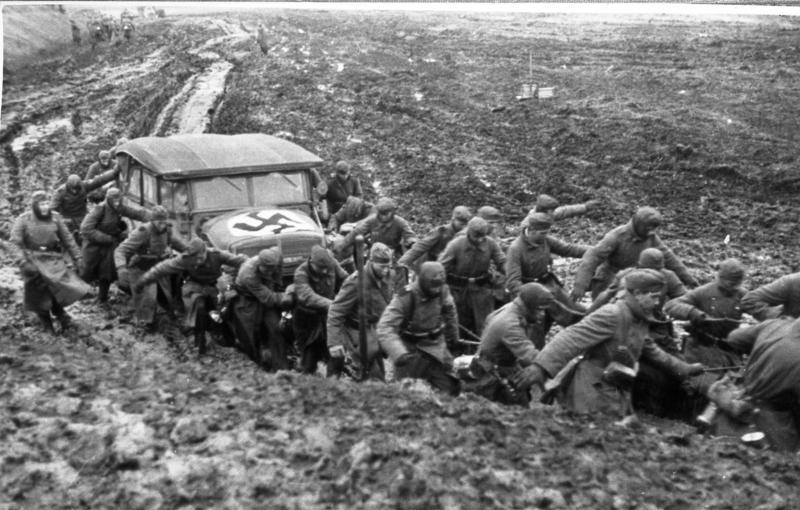
Wehrmacht soldiers pulling a car from the mud during the rasputitsa period, November 1941

Hitler then decided to resume the advance on Moscow, redesignating the panzer groups as panzer armies for the occasion. Operation Typhoon, which was set in motion on 30 September, saw the 2nd Panzer Army rush along the paved road from Oryol (captured 5 October) to the Oka River at Plavsk, while the 4th Panzer Army (transferred from Army Group North to Centre) and 3rd Panzer armies surrounded the Soviet forces in two huge pockets at Vyazma and Bryansk. Just as Operation Typhoon got going, the weather deteriorated. For the remainder of October it rained almost continuously, turning the unpaved road network into mud that trapped German vehicles, slowing tactical movement and supply. Army Group North positioned itself in front of Leningrad and attempted to cut the rail link at Mga to the east. This began the 900-day Siege of Leningrad. North of the Arctic Circle, a German–Finnish force set out for Murmansk but could get no further than the Zapadnaya Litsa River, where they settled down.

Army Group South pushed down from the Dnieper to the Sea of Azov coast, also advancing through Kharkov, Kursk, and Stalino. The combined German and Romanian forces moved into the Crimea and took control of all of the peninsula by autumn (except Sevastopol, which held out until 3 July 1942). On 21 November, the Wehrmacht took Rostov, the gateway to the Caucasus. However, the German lines were over-extended and the Soviet defenders counterattacked the 1st Panzer Army's spearhead from the north, forcing them to pull out of the city and behind the Mius River; the first significant German withdrawal of the war.

The onset of the winter freeze saw one last German lunge that opened on 15 November, when the Wehrmacht attempted to encircle Moscow. On 27 November, the 4th Panzer Army got to within 30 km (19 mi) of the Kremlin when it reached the last tram stop of the Moscow line at Khimki. Meanwhile, the 2nd Panzer Army failed to take Tula, the last Soviet city that stood in its way to the capital. After a meeting held in Orsha between the head of the OKH (Army General Staff), General Franz Halder and the heads of three Army groups and armies, decided to push forward to Moscow since it was better, as argued by the head of Army Group Center, Field Marshal Fedor von Bock, for them to try their luck on the battlefield rather than just sit and wait while their opponent gathered more strength.

However, by 6 December it became clear that the Wehrmacht did not have the strength to capture Moscow, and the attack was suspended. Marshal Shaposhnikov thus began his counterattack, employing freshly mobilised reserves, as well as some well-trained Far-Eastern divisions transferred from the east following intelligence that Japan would remain neutral.

=== Soviet counter-offensive: Winter 1941 ===
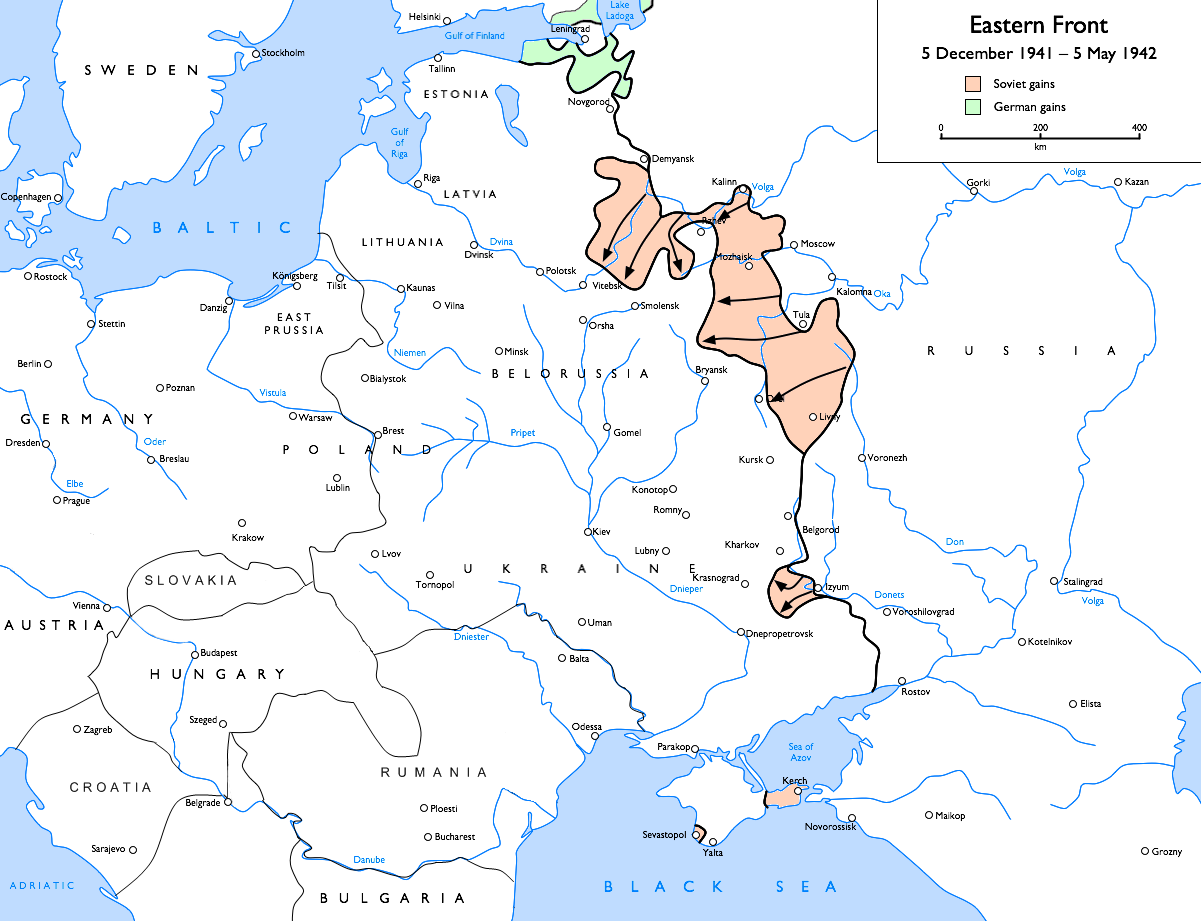
The Soviet winter counter-offensive, 5 December 1941 to 7 May 1942: Soviet gains German gains

The Soviet counter-offensive during the Battle of Moscow had removed the immediate German threat to the city. According to Zhukov, "the success of the December counter-offensive in the central strategic direction was considerable. Having suffered a major defeat the German striking forces of Army Group Centre were retreating." Stalin's objective in January 1942 was "to deny the Germans any breathing space, to drive them westward without let-up, to make them use up their reserves before spring comes..."

The main blow was to be delivered by a double envelopment orchestrated by the Northwestern Front, the Kalinin Front and the Western Front. The overall objective according to Zhukov was the "subsequent encirclement and destruction of the enemy's main forces in the area of Rzhev, Vyazma and Smolensk. The Leningrad Front, the Volkhov Front and the right wing forces of the Northwestern Front were to rout the Army Group North." The Southwestern Front and Southern Front were to defeat Army Group South. The Caucasian Front and Black Sea Fleet were to take back the Crimea.

The 20th Army, part of the Soviet 1st Shock Army, the 22nd Tank Brigade and five ski battalions launched their attack on 10 January 1942. By 17 January, the Soviets had captured Lotoshino and Shakhovskaya. By 20 January, the 5th and 33rd Armies had captured Ruza, Dorokhovo, Mozhaisk, and Vereya, while the 43rd and 49th Armies were at Domanovo.

The Wehrmacht rallied, retaining a salient at Rzhev. A Soviet parachute drop by two battalions of the 201st Airborne Brigade and the 250th Airborne Regiment on 18 and 22 January was designed to "cut off enemy communications with the rear." Lt.-Gen. Mikhail Grigoryevich Yefremov's 33rd Army aided by Gen. Belov's 1st Cavalry Corps and Soviet partisans attempted to seize Vyazma. This force was joined by additional paratroopers of the 8th Airborne Brigade at the end of January. However, in early February, the Germans managed to cut off this force, separating the Soviets from their main force in the rear of the Germans. They were supplied by air until April when they were given permission to regain the Soviet main lines. Only part of Belov's Cavalry Corps made it to safety, however, while Yefremov's men fought "a losing battle."

By April 1942, the Soviet Supreme Command agreed to assume the defensive so as to "consolidate the captured ground." According to Zhukov, "During the winter offensive, the forces of the Western Front had advanced from 70 to 100 km, which somewhat improved the overall operational and strategic situation on the Western sector."

To the north, the Red Army surrounded a German garrison in Demyansk, which held out with air supply for four months, and established themselves in front of Kholm, Velizh, and Velikie Luki. Further north still, the Soviet 2nd Shock Army was unleashed on the Volkhov River. Initially this made some progress; however, it was unsupported, and by June a German counterattack cut off and destroyed the army. The Soviet commander, Lieutenant General Andrey Vlasov, later defected to Germany and formed the ROA or Russian Liberation Army. In the south the Red Army lunged over the Donets River at Izyum and drove a 100 km (62 mi) deep salient. The intent was to pin Army Group South against the Sea of Azov, but as the winter eased the Wehrmacht counter-attacked and cut off the overextended Soviet troops in the Second Battle of Kharkov.

=== Don, Volga, and Caucasus: Summer 1942 ===
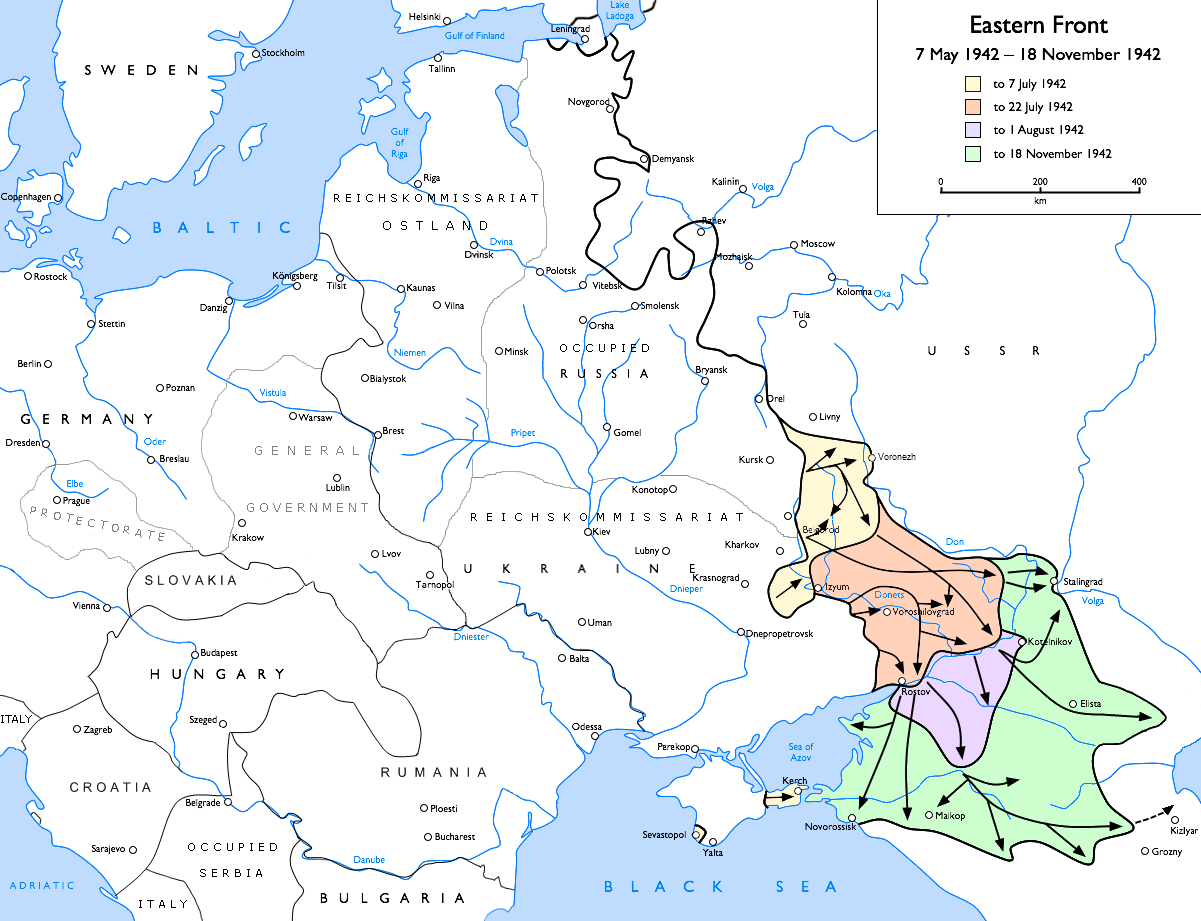
Operation Blue: German advances from 7 May 1942 to 18 November 1942: to 7 July 1942 to 22 July 1942 to 1 August 1942 to 18 November 1942

Although plans were made to attack Moscow again, on 28 June 1942, the offensive reopened in a different direction. Army Group South took the initiative, anchoring the front with the Battle of Voronezh and then following the Don river southeastwards. The grand plan was to secure the Don and Volga first and then drive into the Caucasus towards the oil fields, but operational considerations and Hitler's vanity made him order both objectives to be attempted simultaneously. Rostov was recaptured on 24 July when the 1st Panzer Army joined in, and then that group drove south towards Maikop. As part of this, Operation Shamil was executed, a plan whereby a group of Brandenburger commandos dressed up as Soviet NKVD troops to destabilise Maikop's defences and allow the 1st Panzer Army to enter the oil town with little opposition.

Meanwhile, the 6th Army was driving towards Stalingrad, for a long period unsupported by 4th Panzer Army, which had been diverted to help 1st Panzer Army cross the Don. By the time, the 4th Panzer Army had rejoined the Stalingrad offensive Soviet resistance (comprising the 62nd Army under Vasily Chuikov) had stiffened. A leap across the Don brought German troops to the Volga on 23 August but for the next three months the Wehrmacht would be fighting the Battle of Stalingrad street-by-street.

Towards the south, the 1st Panzer Army had reached the Caucasian foothills and the Malka River. At the end of August Romanian mountain troops joined the Caucasian spearhead, while the Romanian 3rd and 4th armies were redeployed from their successful task of clearing the Azov littoral. They took up position on either side of Stalingrad to free German troops for the main offensive. Mindful of the continuing antagonism between Axis allies Romania and Hungary over Transylvania, the Romanian army in the Don bend was separated from the Hungarian 2nd army by the Italian 8th Army. Thus, all of Hitler's allies were involved – including a Slovak contingent with the 1st Panzer Army and a Croatian Wehrmacht regiment attached to 6th Army.

The advance into the Caucasus bogged down, with the Germans unable to fight their way past Malgobek and to the main prize of Grozny. Instead, they switched the direction of their advance to approach it from the south, crossing the Malka at the end of October and entering North Ossetia and entered the suburbs of Ordzhonikidze on 2 November.

=== Stalingrad: Winter 1942 ===
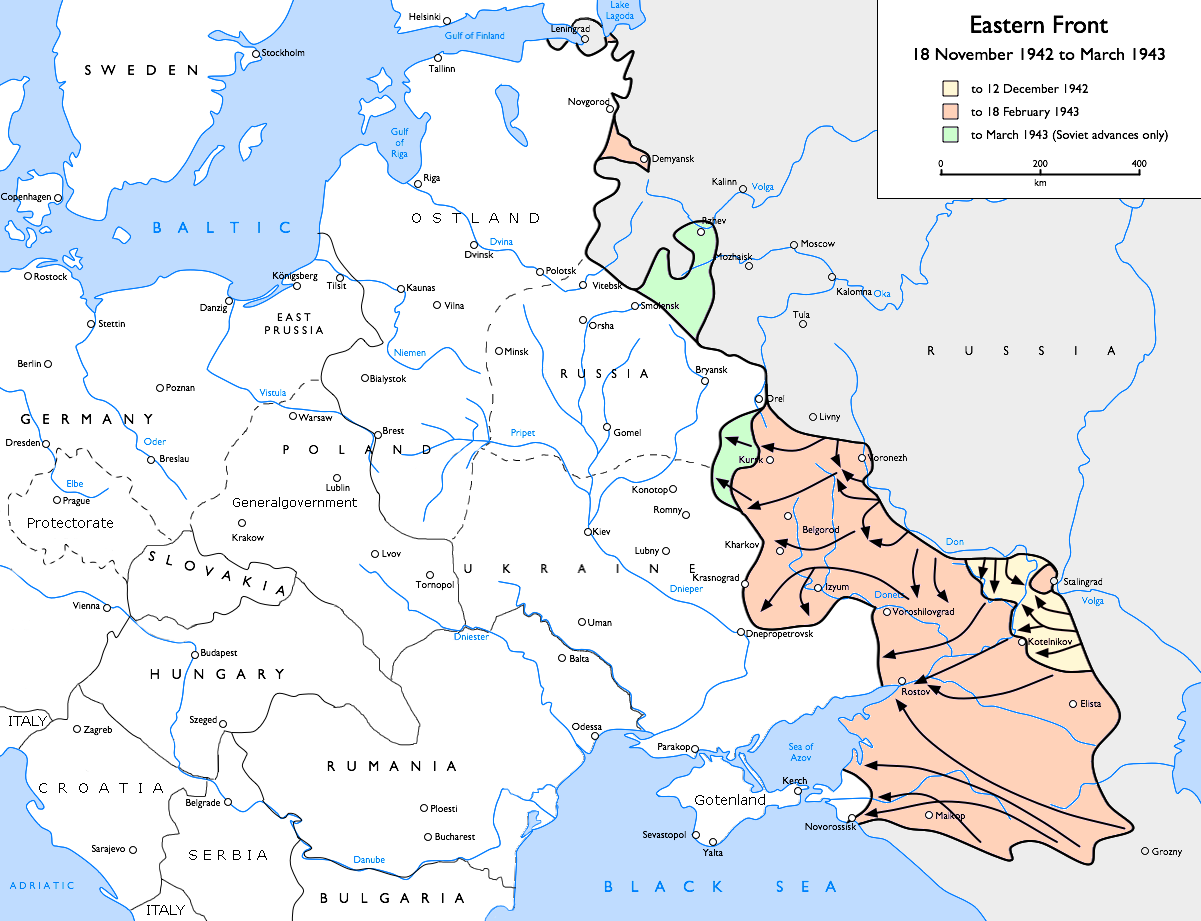
Soviet advances on the Eastern Front, 18 November 1942 to March 1943: to 12 December 1942 to 18 February 1943 to March 1943 (Soviet gains only)

While the German 6th and 4th Panzer Armies had been fighting their way into Stalingrad, Soviet armies had congregated on either side of the city, specifically into the Don bridgeheads, and it was from these that they struck in November 1942. Operation Uranus started on 19 November. Two Soviet fronts punched through the Romanian lines and converged at Kalach on 23 November, trapping 300,000 Axis troops behind them. A simultaneous offensive on the Rzhev sector known as Operation Mars was supposed to advance to Smolensk, but was a costly failure, with German tactical defences preventing any breakthrough.

The Germans rushed to transfer troops to the Soviet Union in a desperate attempt to relieve Stalingrad, but the offensive could not get going until 12 December, by which time the 6th Army in Stalingrad was starving and too weak to break out towards it. Operation Winter Storm, with three transferred panzer divisions, got going briskly from Kotelnikovo towards the Aksai river but became bogged down 65 km (40 mi) short of its goal. To divert the rescue attempt, the Red Army decided to smash the Italians and come down behind the relief attempt if they could; that operation starting on 16 December. What it did accomplish was to destroy many of the aircraft that had been transporting relief supplies to Stalingrad. The fairly limited scope of the Soviet offensive, although still eventually targeted on Rostov, also allowed Hitler time to see sense and pull Army Group A out of the Caucasus and back over the Don.

On 31 January 1943, the 90,000 survivors of the 300,000-man 6th Army surrendered. By that time the Hungarian 2nd Army had also been wiped out. The Red Army advanced from the Don 500 km (310 mi) to the west of Stalingrad, marching through Kursk (retaken on 8 February 1943) and Kharkov (retaken 16 February 1943). To save the position in the south, the Germans decided to abandon the Rzhev salient in February, freeing enough troops to make a successful riposte in eastern Ukraine. Manstein's counteroffensive, strengthened by a specially trained SS Panzer Corps equipped with Tiger tanks, opened on 20 February 1943 and fought its way from Poltava back into Kharkov in the third week of March, when the spring thaw intervened. This left a glaring Soviet bulge in the front centered on Kursk.

=== Kursk: Summer 1943 ===
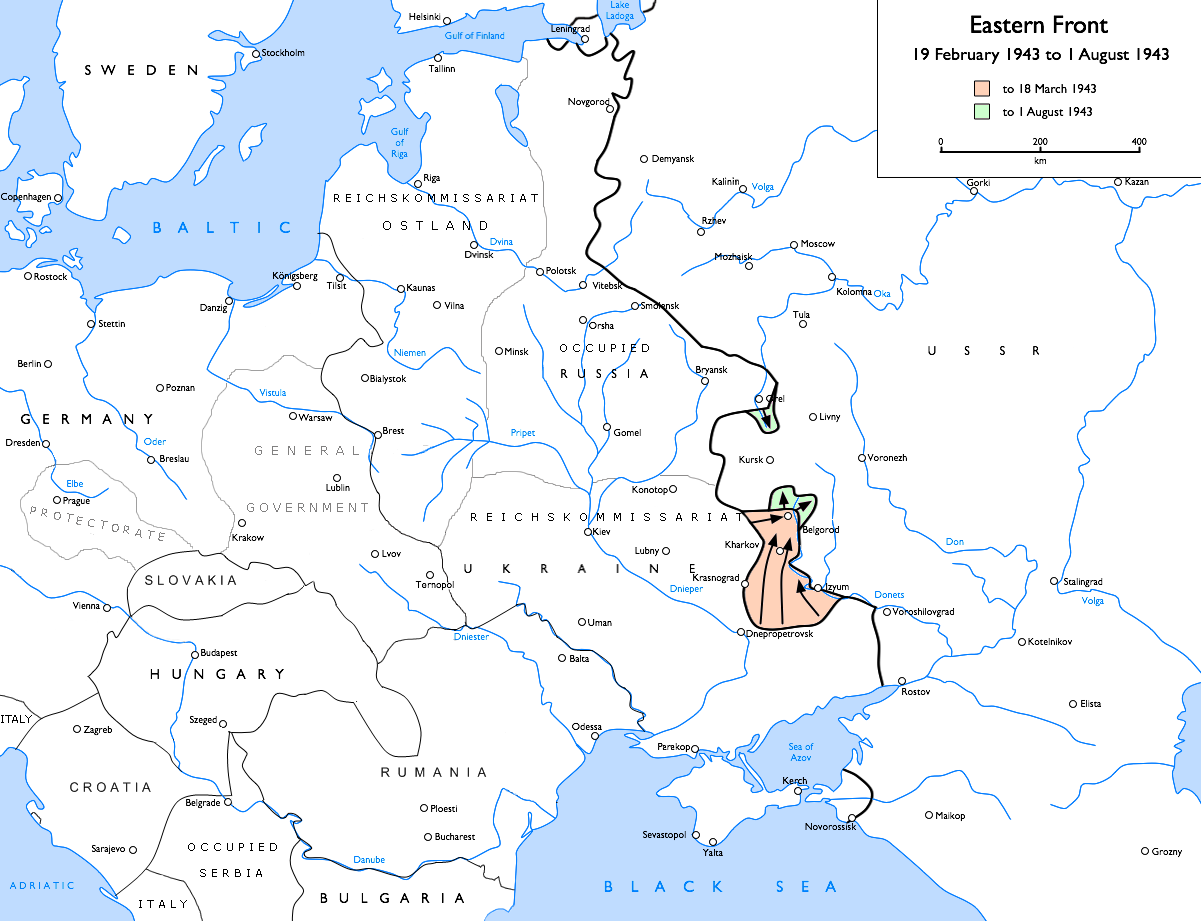
German advances at Kharkov and Kursk, 19 February 1943 to 1 August 1943: to 18 March 1943 to 1 August 1943

After the failure of the attempt to capture Stalingrad, Hitler had delegated planning authority for the upcoming campaign season to the German Army High Command and reinstated Heinz Guderian to a prominent role, this time as Inspector of Panzer Troops. Debate among the General Staff was polarised, with even Hitler nervous about any attempt to pinch off the Kursk salient. He knew that in the intervening six months the Soviet position at Kursk had been reinforced heavily with anti-tank guns, tank traps, landmines, barbed wire, trenches, pillboxes, artillery, and mortars.

However, if one last great blitzkrieg offensive could be mounted, then attention could then be turned to the Allied threat to the Western Front. Certainly, the peace negotiations in April had gone nowhere. The advance would be executed from the Orel salient to the north of Kursk and from Belgorod to the south. Both wings would converge on the area east of Kursk, and by that means restore the lines of Army Group South to the exact points that it held over the winter of 1941–1942.

In the north, the entire German 9th Army had been redeployed from the Rzhev salient into the Orel salient and was to advance from Maloarkhangelsk to Kursk. But its forces could not even get past the first objective at Olkhovatka, just 8 km (5.0 mi) into the advance. The 9th Army blunted its spearhead against the Soviet minefields, frustratingly so considering that the high ground there was the only natural barrier between them and flat tank country all the way to Kursk. The direction of advance was then switched to Ponyri, to the west of Olkhovatka, but the 9th Army could not break through here either and went over to the defensive. The Red Army then launched a counter-offensive, Operation Kutuzov.

On 12 July, the Red Army battled through the demarcation line between the 211th and 293rd divisions on the Zhizdra River and steamed towards Karachev, right behind them and behind Orel. The southern offensive, spearheaded by 4th Panzer Army, led by Gen. Col. Hoth, with three Tank Corps made more headway. Advancing on either side of the upper Donets on a narrow corridor, the II SS Panzer Corps and the Großdeutschland Panzergrenadier divisions battled their way through minefields and over comparatively high ground towards Oboyan. Stiff resistance caused a change of direction from east to west of the front, but the tanks got 25 km (16 mi) before encountering the reserves of the Soviet 5th Guards Tank Army outside Prokhorovka. Battle was joined on 12 July, with about one thousand tanks being engaged.

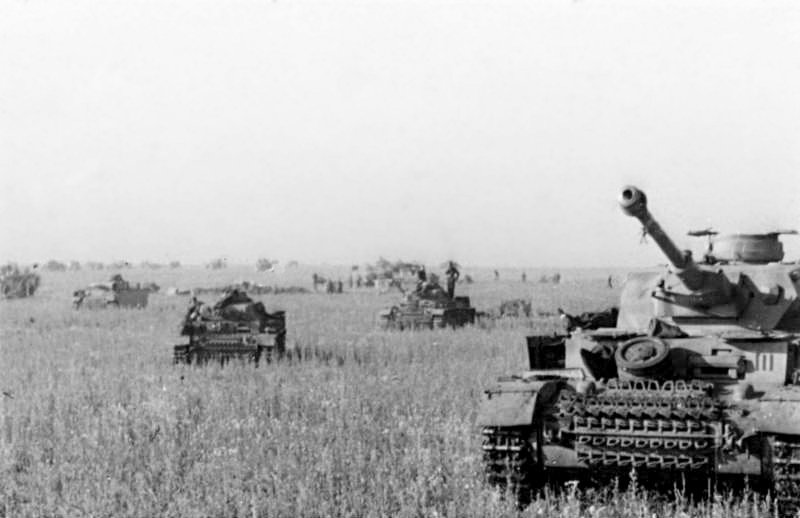
The Battle of Prokhorovka was one of the largest tank battles ever fought. It was part of the wider Battle of Kursk.

After the war, the battle near Prochorovka was idealised by Soviet historians as the largest tank battle of all time. The meeting engagement at Prochorovka was a Soviet defensive success, albeit at heavy cost. The Soviet 5th Guards Tank Army, with about 800 light and medium tanks, attacked elements of the II SS Panzer Corps. Tank losses on both sides have been the source of controversy ever since. Although the 5th Guards Tank Army did not attain its objectives, the German advance had been halted.

At the end of the day both sides had fought each other to a standstill, but regardless of the German failure in the north Manstein proposed he continue the attack with the 4th Panzer Army. The Red Army started the strong offensive operation in the northern Orel salient and achieved a breakthrough on the flank of the German 9th Army. Also worried by the Allies' landing in Sicily on 10 July, Hitler made the decision to halt the offensive even as the German 9th Army was rapidly giving ground in the north. The Germans' final strategic offensive in the Soviet Union ended with their defence against a major Soviet counteroffensive that lasted into August.

The Kursk offensive was the last on the scale of 1940 and 1941 that the Wehrmacht was able to launch; subsequent offensives would represent only a shadow of previous German offensive might.

=== Autumn and winter 1943–44 ===
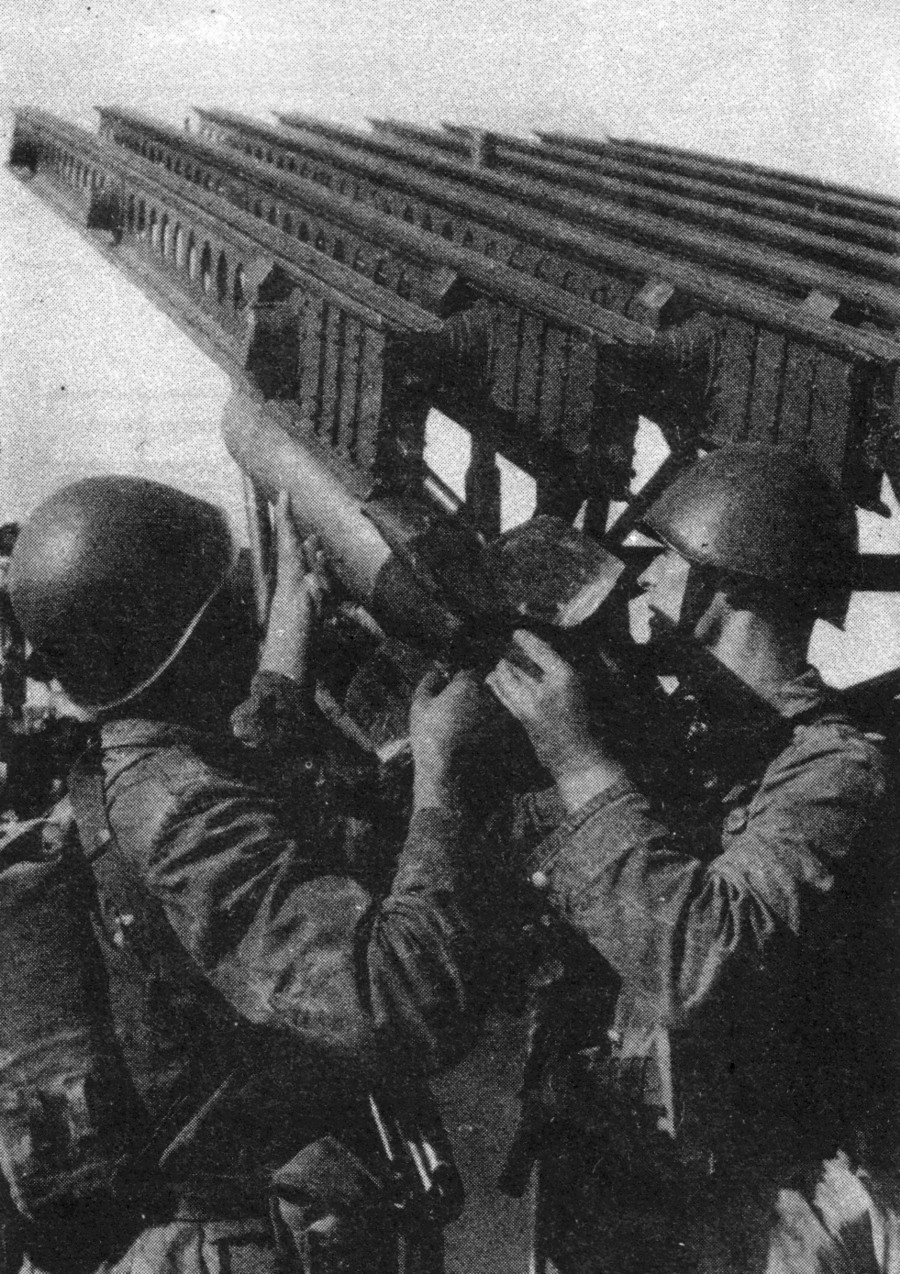
Loading a Soviet "Katyusha" rocket launcher

The Soviet multi-stage summer offensive started with the advance into the Orel salient. The diversion of the well-equipped Großdeutschland Division from Belgorod to Karachev could not counteract it, and the Wehrmacht began a withdrawal from Orel (retaken by the Red Army on 5 August 1943), falling back to the Hagen line in front of Bryansk. To the south, the Red Army broke through Army Group South's Belgorod positions and headed for Kharkov once again. Although intense battles of movement throughout late July and into August 1943 saw the Tigers blunting Soviet tank attacks on one axis, they were soon outflanked on another line to the west as the Soviet forces advanced down the Psel, and Kharkov was abandoned for the final time on 22 August.

The German forces on the Mius, now comprising the 1st Panzer Army and a reconstituted 6th Army, were by August too weak to repulse a Soviet attack on their own front, and when the Red Army hit them they retreated all the way through the Donbas industrial region to the Dnieper, losing half the farmland that Germany had invaded the Soviet Union to exploit. At this time Hitler agreed to a general withdrawal to the Dnieper line, along which was meant to be the Ostwall, a line of defence similar to the Westwall (Siegfried Line) of fortifications along the German frontier in the west.

The main problem for the Wehrmacht was that these defences had not yet been built; by the time Army Group South had evacuated eastern Ukraine and begun withdrawing across the Dnieper during September, the Soviet forces were hard behind them. Tenaciously, small units paddled their way across the 3 km (1.9 mi) wide river and established bridgeheads. A second attempt by the Red Army to gain land using parachutists, mounted at Kaniv on 24 September, proved as disappointing as at Dorogobuzh eighteen months previously. The paratroopers were soon repelled – but not until still more Red Army troops had used the cover they provided to get themselves over the Dnieper and securely dug in.

As September ended and October started, the Germans found the Dnieper line impossible to hold as the Soviet bridgeheads grew. Important Dnieper towns started to fall, with Zaporozhye the first to go, followed by Dnepropetrovsk. Finally, early in November the Red Army broke out of its bridgeheads on either side of Kiev and captured the Ukrainian capital, at that time the third largest city in the Soviet Union.

130 kilometres (80 mi) west of Kiev, the 4th Panzer Army, still convinced that the Red Army was a spent force, was able to mount a successful riposte at Zhytomyr during the middle of November, weakening the Soviet bridgehead by a daring outflanking strike mounted by the SS Panzer Corps along the river Teterev. This battle also enabled Army Group South to recapture Korosten and gain some time to rest. However, on Christmas Eve, the retreat began anew when the First Ukrainian Front (renamed from the Voronezh Front) struck them in the same place. The Soviet advance continued along the railway line until the 1939 Polish–Soviet border was reached on 3 January 1944.

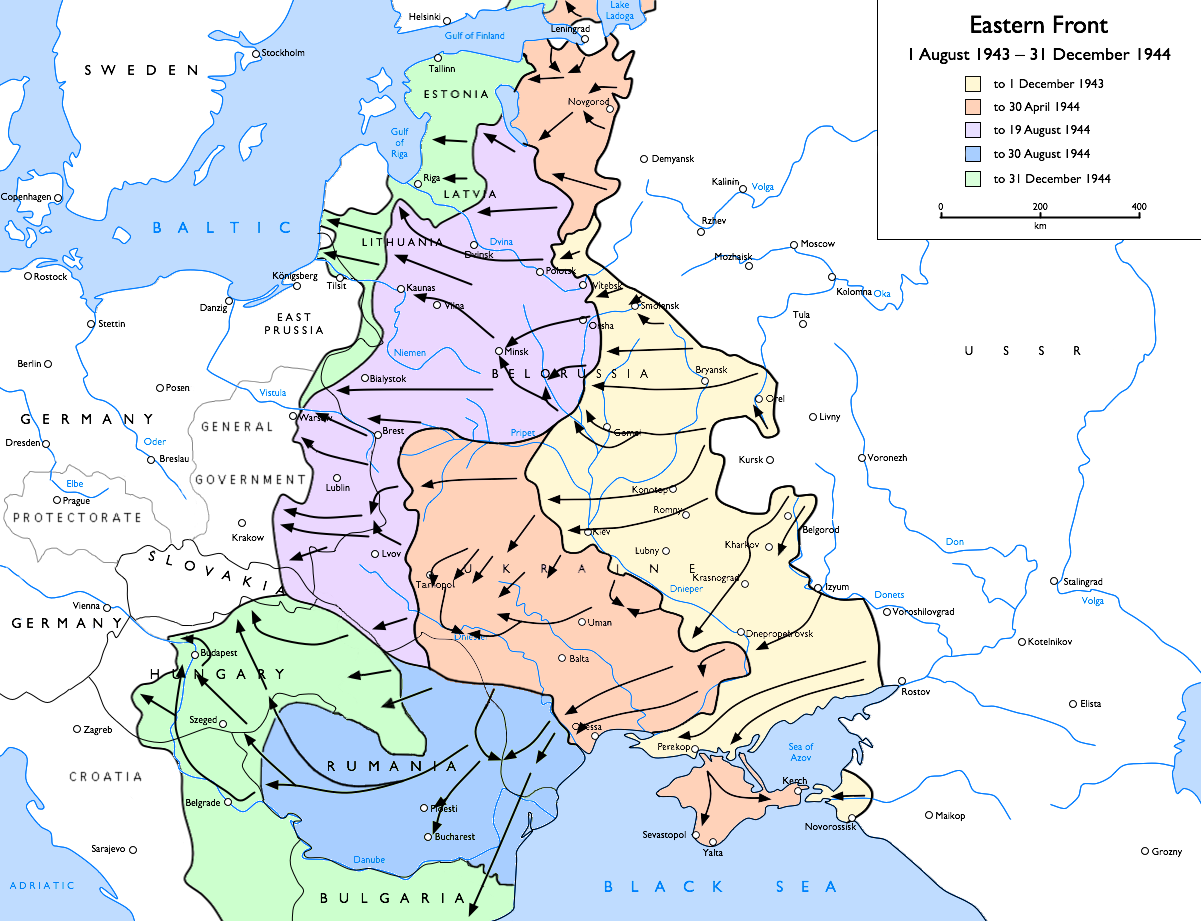
Soviet advances from 1 August 1943 to 31 December 1944: to 1 December 1943 to 30 April 1944 to 19 August 1944 to 31 December 1944

To the south, the Second Ukrainian Front (ex Steppe Front) had crossed the Dnieper at Kremenchug and continued westwards. In the second week of January 1944 they swung north, meeting Vatutin's tank forces which had swung south from their penetration into Poland and surrounding ten German divisions at Korsun–Shevchenkovsky, west of Cherkassy. Hitler's insistence on holding the Dnieper line, even when facing the prospect of catastrophic defeat, was compounded by his conviction that the Cherkassy pocket could break out and even advance to Kiev, but Manstein was more concerned about being able to advance to the edge of the pocket and then implore the surrounded forces to break out.

By 16 February the first stage was complete, with panzers separated from the contracting Cherkassy pocket only by the swollen Gniloy Tikich river. Under shellfire and pursued by Soviet tanks, the surrounded German troops, among whom were the 5th SS Panzer Division Wiking, fought their way across the river to safety, although at the cost of half their number and all their equipment. They assumed the Red Army would not attack again, with the spring approaching, but on 3 March the Soviet Ukrainian Front went over to the offensive. Having already isolated the Crimea by severing the Perekop isthmus, Malinovsky's forces advanced across the mud to the Romanian border, not stopping on the river Prut.

One final move in the south completed the 1943–44 campaigning season, which had wrapped up a Soviet advance of over 800 kilometres (500 mi). In March, 20 German divisions of Generaloberst Hans-Valentin Hube's 1st Panzer Army were encircled in what was to be known as Hube's Pocket near Kamenets-Podolskiy. After two weeks' of heavy fighting, the 1st Panzer managed to escape the pocket, at the cost of losing almost the entirety of their heavy equipment. At this point, Hitler sacked several prominent generals, Manstein included. In April, the Red Army took back Odessa, followed by 4th Ukrainian Front's campaign to restore control over the Crimea, which culminated in the capture of Sevastopol on 10 May.

Along Army Group Centre's front, August 1943 saw this force pushed back from the Hagen line slowly, ceding comparatively little territory, but the loss of Bryansk, and more importantly Smolensk, on 25 September cost the Wehrmacht the keystone of the entire German defensive system. The 4th and 9th armies and 3rd Panzer Army still held their own east of the upper Dnieper, stifling Soviet attempts to reach Vitebsk. On Army Group North's front, there was barely any fighting at all until January 1944, when out of nowhere Volkhov and Second Baltic Fronts struck.

In a lightning campaign, the Germans were pushed back from Leningrad and Novgorod was captured by Soviet forces. After a 120-kilometre (75 mi) advance in January and February, the Leningrad Front had reached the borders of Estonia. To Stalin, the Baltic Sea seemed the quickest way to take the battles to the German territory in East Prussia and seize control of Finland. The Leningrad Front's offensives towards Tallinn, a main Baltic port, were stopped in February 1944. The German army group "Narwa" included Estonian conscripts, defending the re-establishment of Estonian independence.

=== Summer 1944 ===
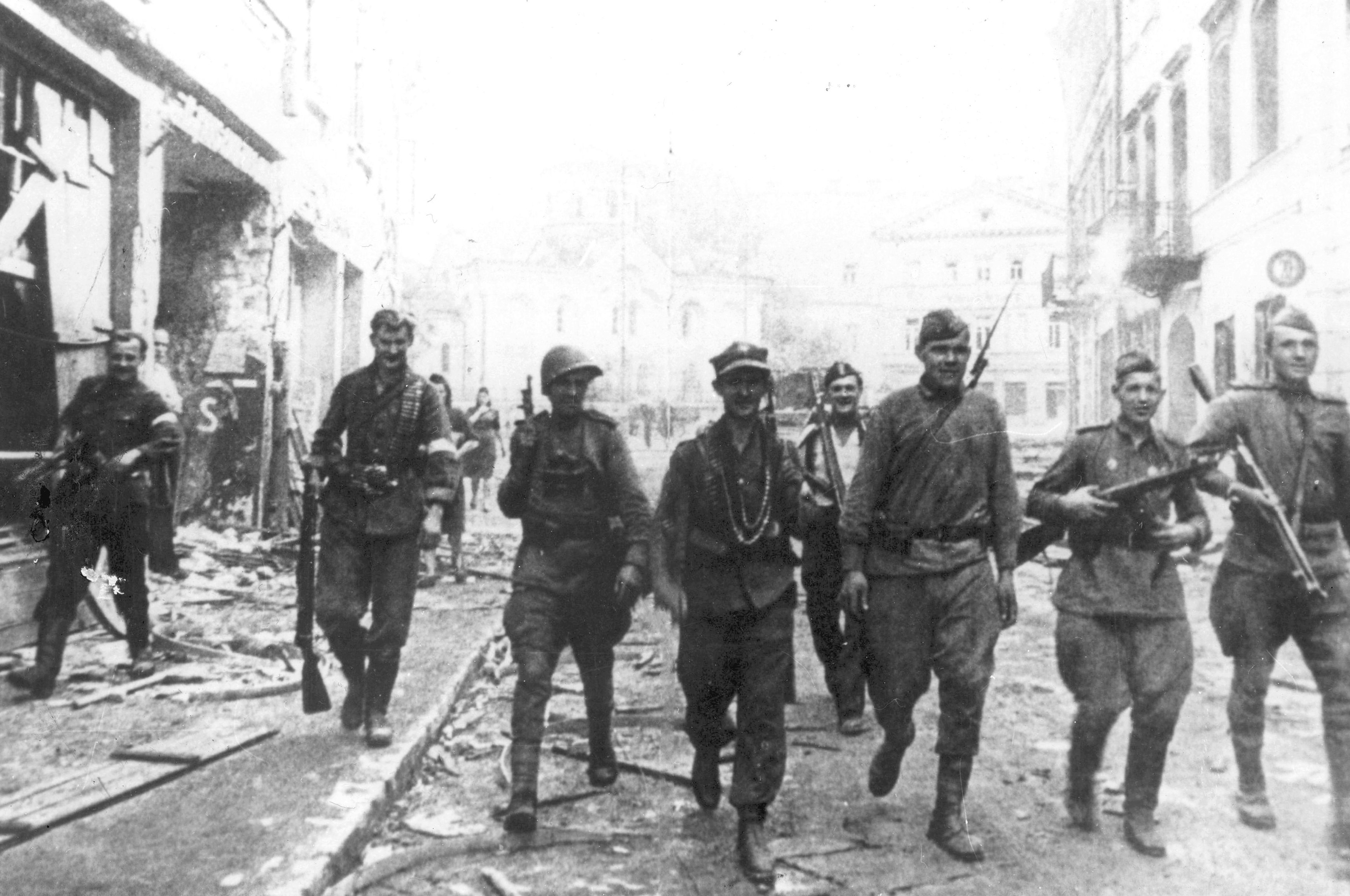
Soviet and Polish Armia Krajowa soldiers in Vilnius, July 1944

Wehrmacht planners were convinced that the Red Army would attack again in the south, where the front was 80 kilometres (50 mi) from Lviv and offered the most direct route to Berlin. Accordingly, they stripped troops from Army Group Centre, whose front still protruded deep into the Soviet Union. The Germans had transferred some units to France to counter the invasion of Normandy two weeks before. The Belorussian Offensive (codenamed Operation Bagration), which was agreed upon by Allies at the Tehran Conference in December 1943 and launched on 22 June 1944, was a massive Soviet attack, consisting of four Soviet army groups totalling over 120 divisions that smashed into a thinly held German line.

They focused their massive attacks on Army Group Centre, not Army Group North Ukraine as the Germans had originally expected. More than 2.3 million Soviet troops went into action against German Army Group Centre, which had a strength of fewer than 800,000 men. At the points of attack, the numerical and quality advantages of the Soviet forces were overwhelming. The Red Army achieved a ratio of ten to one in tanks and seven to one in aircraft over their enemy. The Germans crumbled. The capital of Belarus, Minsk, was taken on 3 July, trapping some 100,000 Germans. Ten days later the Red Army reached the prewar Polish border. Bagration was, by any measure, one of the largest single operations of the war.

By the end of August 1944, it had cost the Germans ~400,000 dead, wounded, missing and sick, from whom 160,000 were captured, as well as 2,000 tanks and 57,000 other vehicles. In the operation, the Red Army lost ~180,000 dead and missing (765,815 in total, including wounded and sick plus 5,073 Poles), as well as 2,957 tanks and assault guns. The offensive at Estonia claimed another 480,000 Soviet soldiers, 100,000 of them classed as dead.

The neighbouring Lvov–Sandomierz operation was launched on 17 July 1944, with the Red Army routing the German forces in Western Ukraine and retaking Lviv. The Soviet advance in the south continued into Romania and, following a coup against the Axis-allied government of Romania on 23 August, the Red Army occupied Bucharest on 31 August. Romania and the Soviet Union signed an armistice on 12 September.

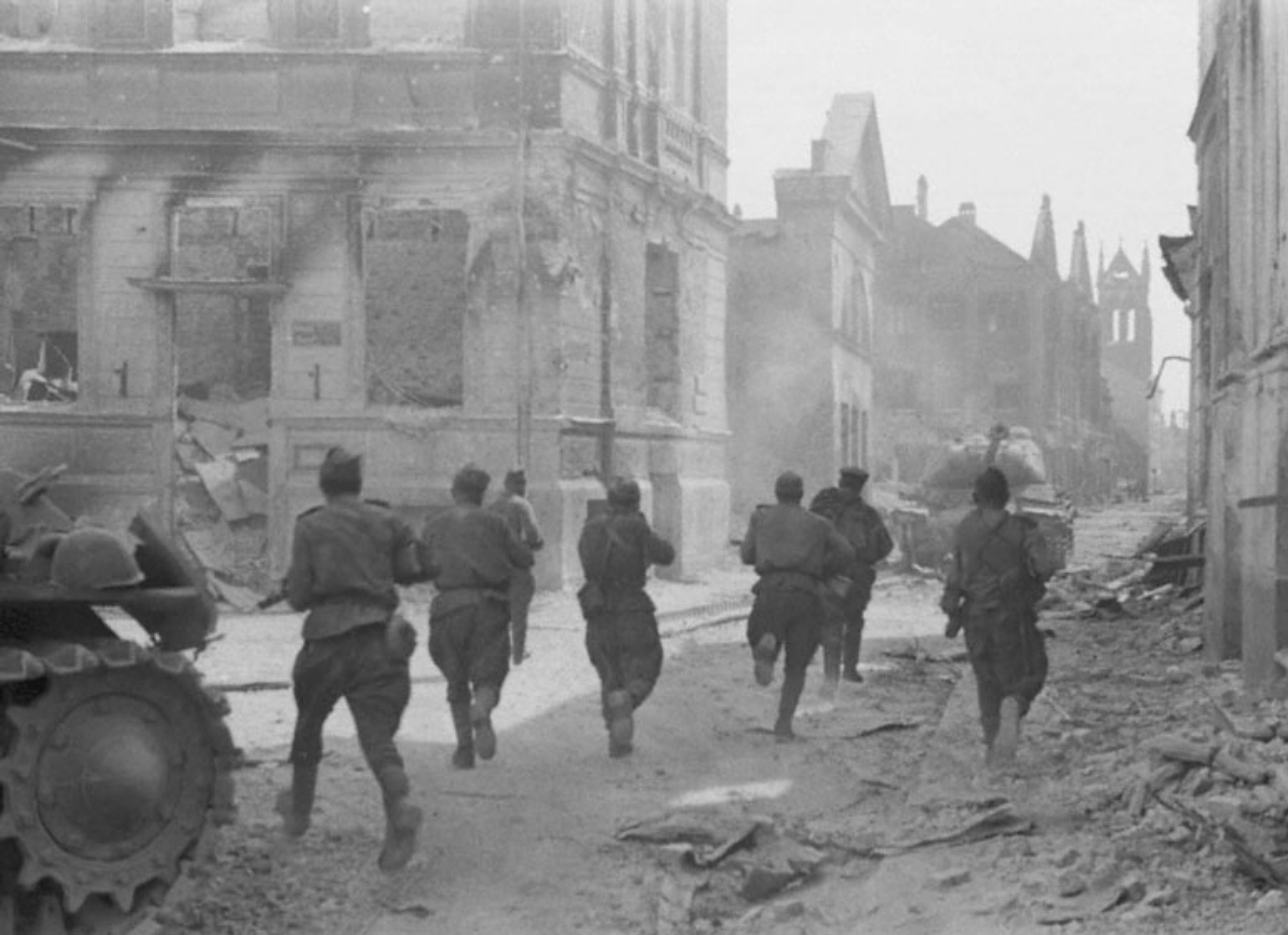
Soviet soldiers advance through the streets of Jelgava, Latvia, mid-1944.

The rapid progress of Operation Bagration threatened to cut off and isolate the German units of Army Group North bitterly resisting the Soviet advance towards Tallinn. Despite a ferocious attack at the Sinimäed Hills, Estonia, the Soviet Leningrad Front failed to break through the defence of the smaller, well-fortified army detachment "Narwa" in terrain not suitable for large-scale operations.

On the Karelian Isthmus, the Red Army launched a Vyborg–Petrozavodsk Offensive against the Finnish lines on 9 June 1944 (coordinated with the Western Allied Invasion of Normandy). Three armies were pitted there against the Finns, among them several experienced guards rifle formations. The attack breached the Finnish front line of defence in Valkeasaari on 10 June and the Finnish forces retreated to their secondary defence line, the VT-line. The Soviet attack was supported by a heavy artillery barrage, air bombardments and armoured forces. The VT-line was breached on 14 June and after a failed counterattack in Kuuterselkä by the Finnish armoured division, the Finnish defence had to be pulled back to the VKT-line. After heavy fighting in the battles of Tali-Ihantala and Ilomantsi, Finnish troops finally managed to halt the Soviet attack.

In Poland, as the Red Army approached, the Polish Home Army (AK) launched Operation Tempest. During the Warsaw Uprising, the Red Army were ordered to halt at the Vistula River. Whether Stalin was unable or unwilling to come to the aid of the Polish resistance is disputed.

In Slovakia, the Slovak National Uprising started as an armed struggle between German Wehrmacht forces and rebel Slovak troops between August and October 1944. It was centered at Banská Bystrica.

=== Autumn 1944 ===
In the Autumn of 1944, the Soviets paused their offensive towards Berlin to first gain control over the Balkans.

On 8 September 1944 the Red Army began an attack on the Dukla Pass on the Slovak–Polish border. Two months later, the Soviet forces won the battle and entered Slovakia. The toll was high: 20,000 Red Army soldiers died, plus several thousand Germans, Slovaks and Czechs.

Under the pressure of the Soviet Baltic Offensive, the German Army Group North were withdrawn to fight in the sieges of Saaremaa, Courland and Memel.

=== January–March 1945 ===
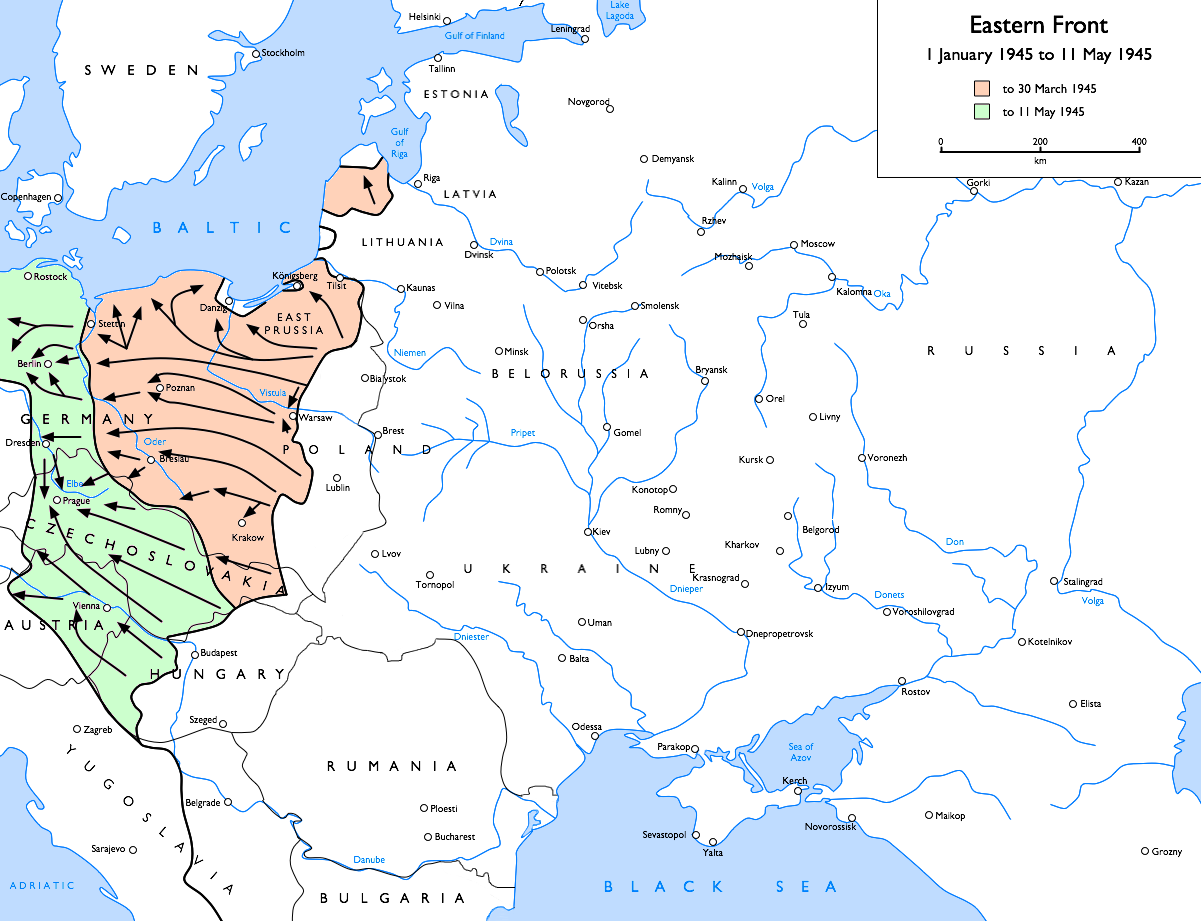
Soviet advances from 1 January 1945 to 11 May 1945: to 30 March 1945 to 11 May 1945

The Soviet Union finally entered Warsaw on 17 January 1945, after the city was destroyed and abandoned by the Germans. Over three days, on a broad front incorporating four army fronts, the Red Army launched the Vistula–Oder Offensive across the Narew River and from Warsaw. The Soviets outnumbered the Germans on average by 5–6:1 in troops, 6:1 in artillery, 6:1 in tanks and 4:1 in self-propelled artillery. After four days the Red Army broke out and started moving thirty to forty kilometres a day, taking the Baltic states, Danzig, East Prussia, Poznań, and drawing up on a line sixty kilometres east of Berlin along the River Oder. During the full course of the Vistula–Oder operation (23 days), the Red Army forces sustained 194,191 total casualties (killed, wounded and missing) and lost 1,267 tanks and assault guns.

On 25 January 1945, Hitler renamed three army groups. Army Group North became Army Group Courland; Army Group Centre became Army Group North and Army Group A became Army Group Centre. Army Group North (old Army Group Centre) was driven into an ever-smaller pocket around Königsberg in East Prussia.

A limited counterattack (codenamed Operation Solstice) by the newly created Army Group Vistula, under the command of Reichsführer-SS Heinrich Himmler, had failed by 24 February, and the Red Army drove on to Pomerania and cleared the right bank of the Oder River. In the south, the German attempts, in Operation Konrad, to relieve the encircled garrison at Budapest failed and the city fell on 13 February. On 6 March, the Germans launched what would be their final major offensive of the war, Operation Spring Awakening, which failed by 16 March. On 30 March the Red Army entered Austria and captured Vienna on 13 April.

The OKW – Oberkommando der Wehrmacht or High Command of the German Army – claimed German losses of 77,000 killed, 334,000 wounded and 192,000 missing, with a total of 603,000 men, on the Eastern Front during January and February 1945.

On 9 April 1945, Königsberg in East Prussia finally fell to the Red Army, although the shattered remnants of Army Group Centre continued to resist on the Vistula Spit and Hel Peninsula until the end of the war in Europe. The East Prussian operation, though often overshadowed by the Vistula–Oder operation and the later battle for Berlin, was in fact one of the largest and costliest operations fought by the Red Army throughout the war. During the period it lasted (13 January – 25 April), it cost the Red Army 584,788 casualties, and 3,525 tanks and assault guns.

The fall of Königsberg allowed Stavka to free up General Konstantin Rokossovsky's 2nd Belorussian Front (2BF) to move west to the east bank of the Oder. During the first two weeks of April, the Red Army performed their fastest front redeployment of the war. General Georgy Zhukov concentrated his 1st Belorussian Front (1BF), which had been deployed along the Oder river from Frankfurt in the south to the Baltic, into an area in front of the Seelow Heights. The 2BF moved into the positions being vacated by the 1BF north of the Seelow Heights. While this redeployment was in progress, gaps were left in the lines and the remnants of the German 2nd Army, which had been bottled up in a pocket near Danzig, managed to escape across the Oder. To the south General Ivan Konev shifted the main weight of the 1st Ukrainian Front (1UF) out of Upper Silesia north-west to the Neisse River. The three Soviet fronts had altogether some 2.5 million men (including 78,556 soldiers of the 1st Polish Army); 6,250 tanks; 7,500 aircraft; 41,600 artillery pieces and mortars; 3,255 truck-mounted Katyusha rocket launchers, (nicknamed "Stalin Organs"); and 95,383 motor vehicles, many of which were manufactured in the United States.

=== End of the war: April–May 1945 ===
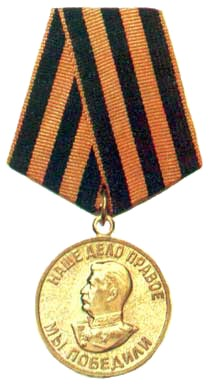
14,933,000 Soviet and Soviet-allied personnel were awarded the Medal for Victory over Germany.

A flag of the Soviet 150th Rifle Division raised over the Reichstag (the Victory Banner)

The Soviet offensive had two objectives. Because of Stalin's suspicions about the intentions of the Western Allies to hand over territory occupied by them in the post-war Soviet sphere of influence, the offensive was to be on a broad front and was to move as rapidly as possible to the west, to meet the Western Allies as far west as possible. But the over-riding objective was to capture Berlin. The two were complementary because possession of the zone could not be won quickly unless Berlin was taken. Another consideration was that Berlin itself held strategic assets, including Adolf Hitler and part of the German atomic bomb program.

The offensive to capture central Germany and Berlin started on 16 April with an assault on the German front lines on the Oder and Neisse rivers. After several days of heavy fighting the Soviet 1BF and 1UF punched holes through the German front line and were fanning out across central Germany. By 24 April, elements of the 1BF and 1UF had completed the encirclement of the German capital and the Battle of Berlin entered its final stages. On 25 April the 2BF broke through the German 3rd Panzer Army's line south of Stettin. They were now free to move west towards the British 21st Army Group and north towards the Baltic port of Stralsund. The 58th Guards Rifle Division of the 5th Guards Army made contact with the US 69th Infantry Division of the First Army near Torgau, Germany at the Elbe river.

On 29 and 30 April, as the Soviet forces fought their way into the centre of Berlin, Adolf Hitler married Eva Braun and then committed suicide by shooting himself. In his will, Hitler appointed Grand Admiral Karl Dönitz as new President of the Reich and Propaganda Minister Joseph Goebbels as new Chancellor of the Reich; however, Goebbels also committed suicide, along with his wife Magda and their children, on 1 May 1945. Helmuth Weidling, defence commandant of Berlin, surrendered the city to the Soviet forces on 2 May. Altogether, the Berlin operation (16 April – 2 May) cost the Red Army 361,367 casualties (dead, wounded, missing and sick) and 1,997 tanks and assault guns. German losses in this period of the war remain impossible to determine with any reliability.

Upon learning of Hitler and Goebbels's death, Dönitz (now President of the Reich) appointed Johann Ludwig Schwerin von Krosigk as new "Leading Minister" of the German Reich. Rapidly advancing Allied forces limited the jurisdiction of the new German government to an area around Flensburg near the Danish border, where Dönitz's headquarters were located, along with Mürwik. Accordingly, this administration was referred to as the Flensburg government. Dönitz and Schwerin von Krosigk attempted to negotiate an armistice with the Western Allies while continuing to resist the Soviet Army, but were eventually forced to accept an unconditional surrender on all fronts.

At 2:41 a.m. on 7 May 1945, at SHAEF headquarters, German Chief-of-Staff General Alfred Jodl signed the unconditional surrender documents for all German forces to the Allies at Reims in France. It included the phrase All forces under German control to cease active operations at 2301 hours Central European time on 8 May 1945. The next day shortly before midnight, Field Marshal Wilhelm Keitel repeated the signing in Berlin at Zhukov's headquarters, now known as the German-Russian Museum. The war in Europe was over.

In the Soviet Union the end of the war is considered to be 9 May, when the surrender took effect Moscow time. This date is celebrated as a national holiday – Victory Day – in Russia (as part of a two-day 8–9 May holiday) and some other post-Soviet countries. The ceremonial Victory parade was held in Moscow on 24 June.

The German Army Group Centre initially refused to surrender and continued to fight in Czechoslovakia until about 11 May. A small German garrison on the Danish island of Bornholm refused to surrender until they were bombed and invaded by the Soviets. The island was returned to the Danish government four months later.

The final battle of the Second World War on the Eastern Front, the Battle of Slivice, broke out on 11 May and ended in a Soviet victory on the 12th.

On 13 May 1945, all Soviet offensives ceased and the fighting on the Eastern Front of World War II came to an end.

=== Soviet Far East: August 1945 ===
After the German defeat, Stalin promised his allies Truman and Churchill that he would attack the Japanese within 90 days of the German surrender. The Soviet invasion of Manchuria began on 8 August 1945, with an assault on the Japanese puppet states of Manchukuo and neighbouring Mengjiang; the greater offensive would eventually include northern Korea, southern Sakhalin, and the Kuril Islands. Apart from the Battles of Khalkhin Gol, it marked the only military action of the Soviet Union against Imperial Japan; at the Yalta Conference, it had agreed to Allied pleas to terminate the neutrality pact with Japan and enter the Second World War's Pacific theatre within three months after the end of the war in Europe. While not a part of the Eastern Front operations, it is included here because the commanders and much of the forces used by the Red Army came from the European Theatre of operations and benefited from the experience gained there.

== Results ==
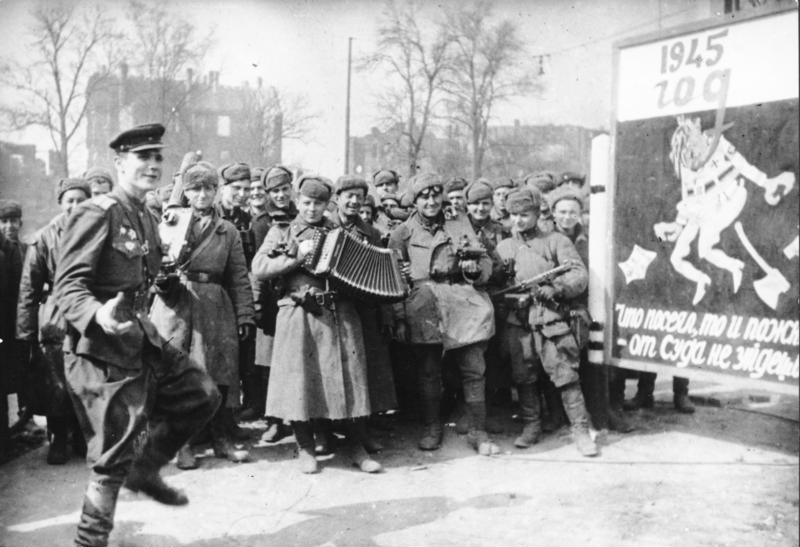
Soviet soldiers celebrating the surrender of the German forces in Berlin, 2 May 1945

The Eastern Front was the largest and bloodiest theatre of World War II. It is generally accepted as being the deadliest conflict in human history, with over 30 million killed as a result. The German armed forces suffered 80% of its military deaths in the Eastern Front. It involved more land combat than all other World War II theatres combined. The largest military operation in history, Operation Barbarossa, the bloodiest battle in history, Stalingrad, the most lethal siege in history, Leningrad, and the single largest battle in history, Kursk, all occurred on the Eastern Front. The distinctly brutal nature of warfare on the Eastern Front was exemplified by an often willful disregard for human life by both sides. It was also reflected in the ideological premise for the war, which saw a momentous clash between two directly opposed ideologies.

Aside from the ideological conflict, the mindframe of the leaders of Germany and the Soviet Union, Hitler and Stalin, respectively, contributed to the escalation of terror and murder on an unprecedented scale. Stalin and Hitler both disregarded human life in order to achieve their goal of victory. This included the terrorisation of their own people, as well as mass deportations of entire populations. All these factors resulted in tremendous brutality both to combatants and civilians that found no parallel on the Western Front. According to Time magazine: "By measure of manpower, duration, territorial reach and casualties, the Eastern Front was as much as four times the scale of the conflict on the Western Front that opened with the Normandy invasion." Conversely, General George Marshall, the U.S. Army Chief of Staff, calculated that without the Eastern Front, the United States would have had to double the number of its soldiers on the Western Front.

Memorandum for the President's Special Assistant Harry Hopkins, Washington, D.C., 10 August 1943:

In World War II, Russia occupies a dominant position and is the decisive factor looking toward the defeat of the Axis in Europe. While in Sicily the forces of Great Britain and the United States are being opposed by 2 German divisions, the Russian front is receiving attention of approximately 200 German divisions. Whenever the Allies open a second front on the Continent, it will be decidedly a secondary front to that of Russia; theirs will continue to be the main effort. Without Russia in the war, the Axis cannot be defeated in Europe, and the position of the United Nations becomes precarious. Similarly, Russia's post-war position in Europe will be a dominant one. With Germany crushed, there is no power in Europe to oppose her tremendous military forces.

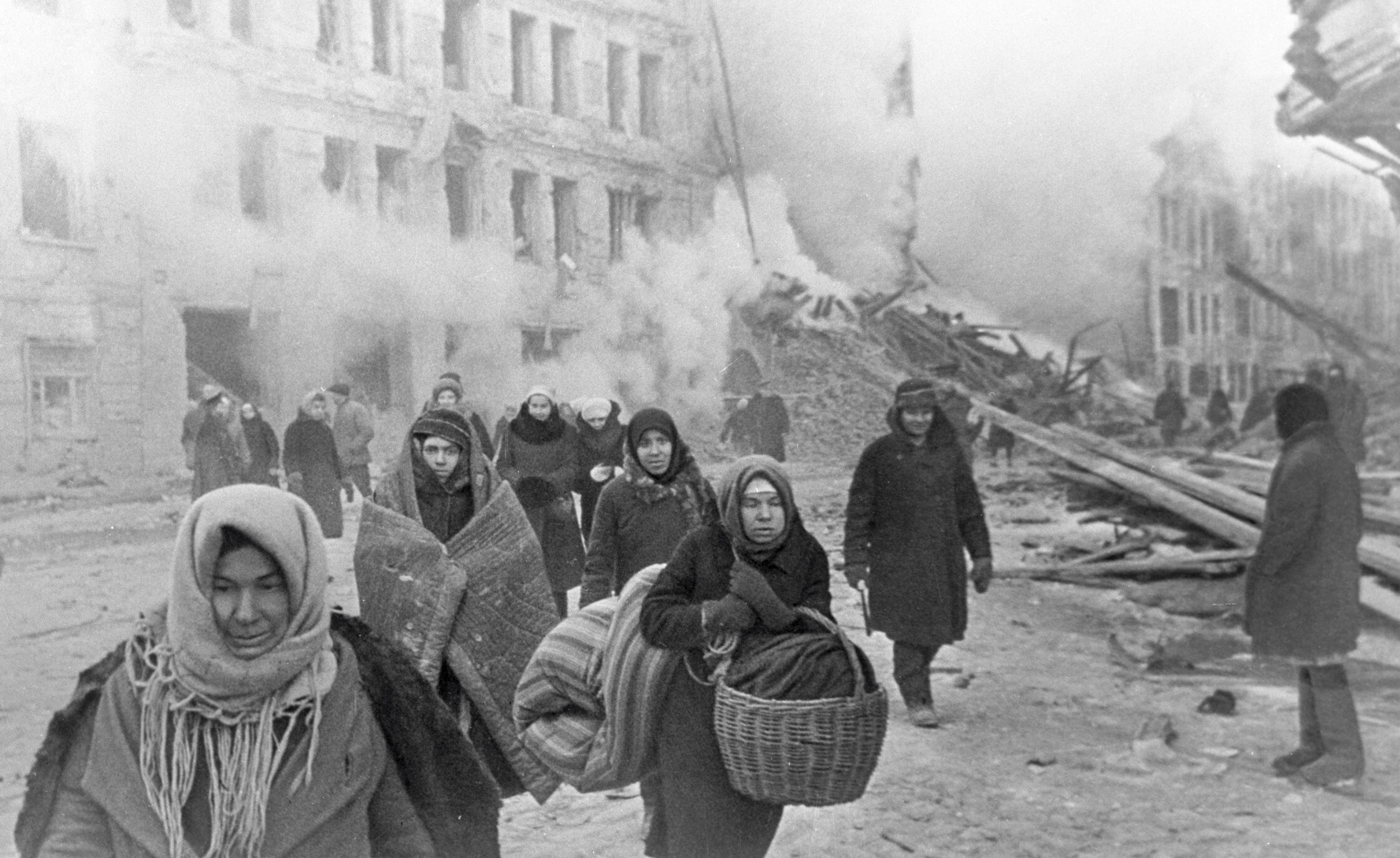
Citizens of Leningrad during the 872-day siege, in which about one million civilians died

The war inflicted huge losses and suffering upon the civilian populations of the affected countries. Behind the front lines, atrocities against civilians in German-occupied areas were routine, including those carried out as part of the Holocaust. German and German-allied forces treated civilian populations with exceptional brutality, massacring whole village populations and routinely killing civilian hostages (see German war crimes). Both sides practised widespread scorched earth tactics, but the loss of civilian lives in the case of Germany was incomparably smaller than that of the Soviet Union, in which at least 20 million were killed. According to British historian Geoffrey Hosking, "The full demographic loss to the Soviet peoples was even greater: since a high proportion of those killed were young men of child-begetting age, the post-war Soviet population was 45 to 50 million smaller than post-1939 projections would have led one to expect."

When the Red Army invaded Germany in 1944, many German civilians suffered from reprisals by Red Army soldiers (see Soviet war crimes). After the war, following the Yalta Conference agreements between the Allies, the German populations of East Prussia and Silesia were displaced to the west of the Oder–Neisse line, in what became one of the largest forced migrations of people in world history.

The Soviet Union came out of World War II militarily victorious but economically and structurally devastated. Much of the combat took place in or close to populated areas, and the actions of both sides contributed to massive loss of civilian life and tremendous material damage. According to a summary, presented by Lieutenant General Roman Rudenko at the International Military Tribunal in Nuremberg, the property damage in the Soviet Union inflicted by the Axis invasion was estimated to a value of 679 billion rubles. The largest number of civilian deaths in a single city was 1.2 million citizens dead during the Siege of Leningrad.

The combined damage consisted of complete or partial destruction of 1,710 cities and towns, 70,000 villages/hamlets, 2,508 church buildings, 31,850 industrial establishments, 64,000 kilometres (40,000 mi) of railroad, 4,100 railroad stations, 40,000 hospitals, 84,000 schools, and 43,000 public libraries; leaving 25 million homeless. Seven million horses, 17 million cattle, 20 million pigs, 27 million sheep were also slaughtered or driven off. Wild fauna were also affected. Wolves and foxes fleeing westward from the killing zone, as the Soviet army advanced between 1943 and 1945, were responsible for a rabies epidemic that spread slowly westwards, reaching the coast of the English Channel by 1968.

== Leadership ==
The Soviet Union and Nazi Germany were both ideologically driven states (by Soviet communism and by Nazism, respectively), in which the foremost political leaders had near-absolute power. The character of the war was thus determined by the political leaders and their ideology to a much greater extent than in any other theatre of World War II.

=== Adolf Hitler ===
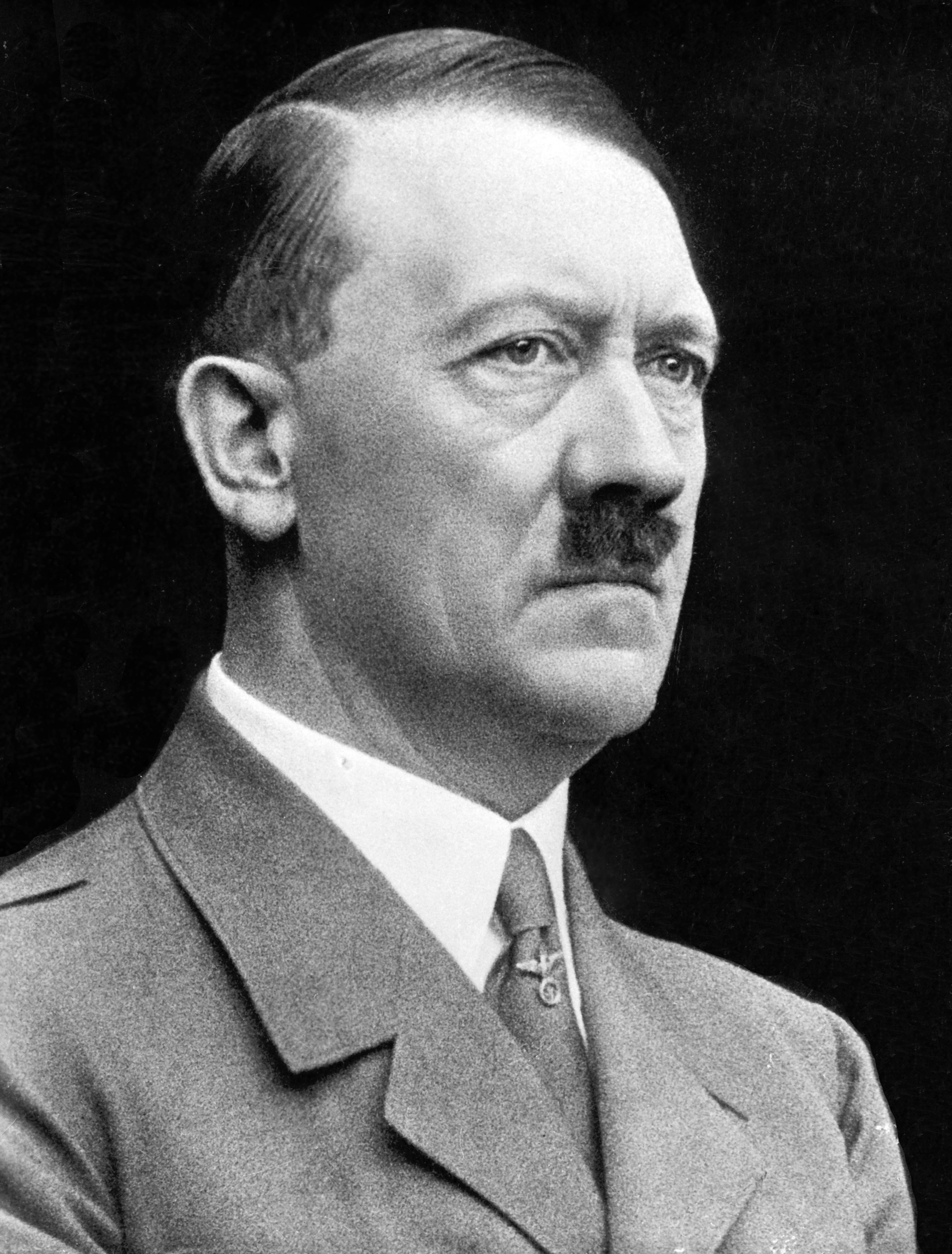
Adolf Hitler led Germany during World War II.

Hitler exercised tight control over the German war effort, spending much of his time in his command bunkers (most notably at Rastenburg in East Prussia, at Vinnitsa in Ukraine, and under the garden of the Reich Chancellery in Berlin). At crucial periods in the war he held daily situation-conferences at which he used his remarkable talent for public speaking to overwhelm opposition from his generals and from the OKW staff with rhetoric.

In part because of the unexpected degree of German success in the Battle of France (despite the warnings of the professional military) Hitler believed himself a military genius, with a grasp of the total war effort that eluded his generals. In August 1941, when Walther von Brauchitsch (commander-in-chief of the Wehrmacht) and Fedor von Bock appealed for an attack on Moscow, Hitler instead ordered the encirclement and capture of Ukraine, in order to acquire the farmland, industry, and natural resources of that country. Some historians like Bevin Alexander in How Hitler Could Have Won regard this decision as a missed opportunity to win the war.

In the winter of 1941–1942 Hitler believed that his obstinate refusal to allow the German armies to retreat had saved Army Group Centre from collapse. He later told Erhard Milch:

I had to act ruthlessly. I had to send even my closest generals packing, two army generals, for example ... I could only tell these gentlemen, "Get yourself back to Germany as rapidly as you can – but leave the army in my charge. And the army is staying at the front."

The success of this hedgehog defence outside Moscow led Hitler to insist on the holding of territory when it made no military sense, and to sack generals who retreated without orders. Officers with initiative were replaced with yes-men or with fanatical Nazis. The disastrous encirclements later in the war – at Stalingrad, Korsun and many other places – resulted directly from Hitler's orders. This idea of holding territory led to another failed plan, dubbed "Heaven-bound Missions", which involved fortifying even the most unimportant or insignificant of cities and the holding of these "fortresses" at all costs. Many divisions became cut off in "fortress" cities, or wasted uselessly in secondary theatres, because Hitler would not sanction retreat or voluntarily abandon any of his conquests.

Frustration at Hitler's leadership in the war was one of the factors in the attempted coup d'etat of 1944, but after the failure of the 20 July Plot Hitler considered the army and its officer corps suspect and came to rely on the Schutzstaffel (SS) and Nazi party members to prosecute the war.

Hitler's direction of the war ultimately proved disastrous for the German Army. F. W. Winterbotham wrote of Hitler's signal to Gerd von Rundstedt to continue the attack to the west during the Battle of the Bulge:

From experience we had learned that when Hitler started refusing to do what the generals recommended, things started to go wrong, and this was to be no exception.

=== Joseph Stalin ===
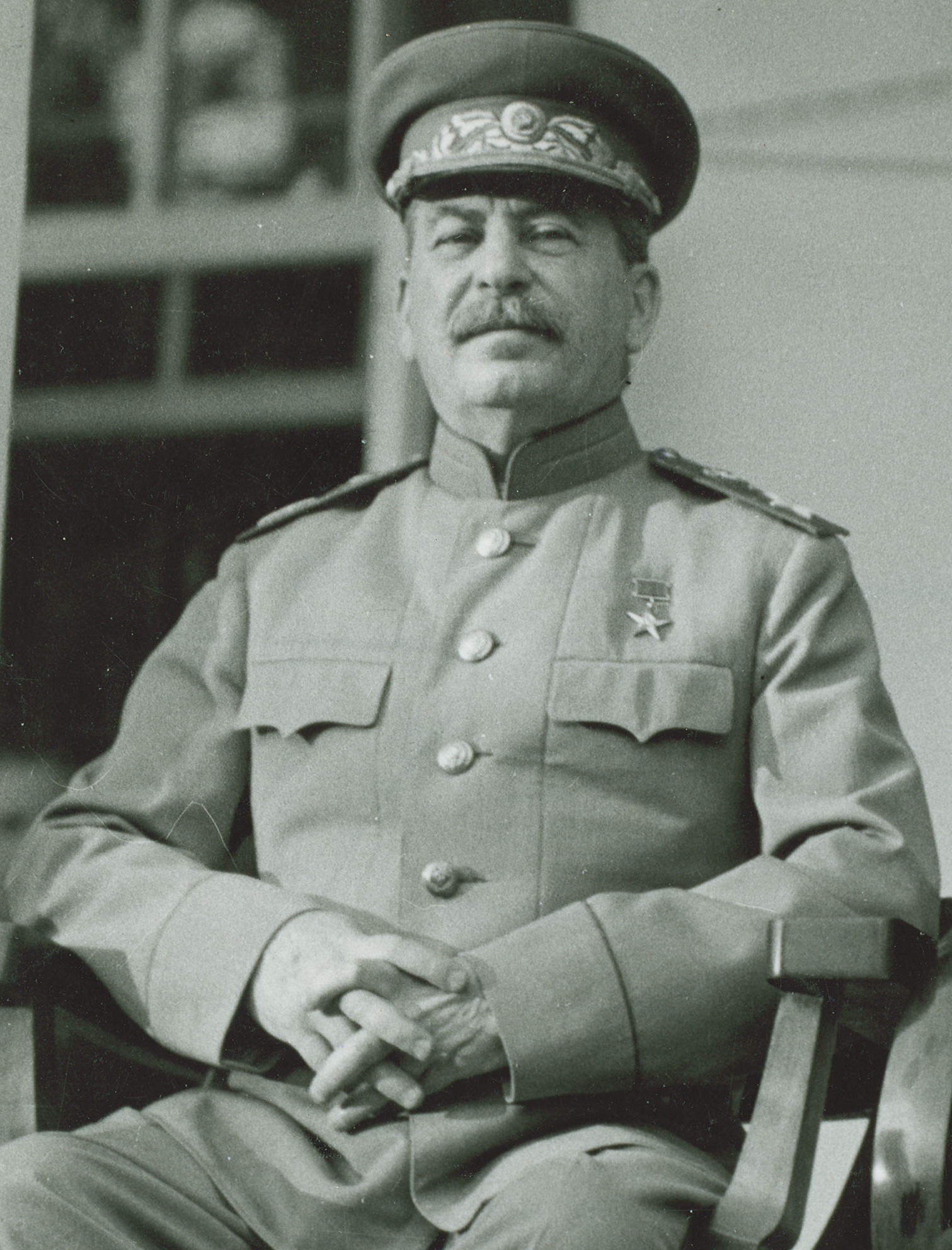
Joseph Stalin led the Soviet Union during World War II.

Stalin bore the greatest responsibility for some of the disasters at the beginning of the war (for example, the Battle of Kiev in 1941), but equally deserves praise for the subsequent success of the Soviet Red Army, which depended on the unprecedentedly rapid industrialisation of the Soviet Union, which Stalin's internal policy had made the first priority throughout the 1930s. Stalin's Great Purge of the Red Army in the late 1930s involved the legal prosecution of many of the senior command, many of whom the courts convicted and sentenced to death or to imprisonment.

The executed included Mikhail Tukhachevsky, a proponent of armoured blitzkrieg. Stalin promoted some obscurantists like Grigory Kulik who opposed the mechanisation of the army and the production of tanks, but on the other hand purged the older commanders who had held their positions since the Russian Civil War of 1917–1922, and who had experience, but were deemed "politically unreliable". This opened up their places to the promotion of many younger officers that Stalin and the NKVD regarded as in line with Stalinist politics. Many of these newly promoted commanders proved terribly inexperienced, but some later became very successful. Soviet tank-output remained the largest in the world.

From the foundation of the Red Army in 1918, political distrust of the military had led to a system of "dual command", with every commander paired with a political commissar, a member of the Communist Party of the Soviet Union. Larger units had military councils consisting of the commander, commissar and chief of staff – commissars ensured the loyalty of the commanding officers and implemented Party orders.

Following the Soviet occupation of eastern Poland, of the Baltic states and of Bessarabia and Northern Bukovina in 1939–1940, Stalin insisted on the occupation of every fold of the newly Sovietized territories; this move westward positioned troops far from their depots, in salients that left them vulnerable to encirclement. As tension heightened in spring, 1941, Stalin desperately tried not to give Hitler any provocation that Berlin could use as an excuse for a German attack; Stalin refused to allow the military to go on the alert – even as German troops gathered on the borders and German reconnaissance planes overflew installations. This refusal to take necessary action was instrumental in the destruction of major portions of the Red Air Force, lined up on its airfields, in the first days of the German–Soviet war.

At the crisis of the war, in the autumn of 1942, Stalin made many concessions to the army: the government restored unitary command by removing the Commissars from the chain of command. Order 25 of 15 January 1943 introduced shoulder boards for all ranks; this represented a significant symbolic step, since after the Russian Revolution of 1917 shoulder boards had connotations as a symbol of the old Tsarist régime. Beginning in autumn 1941, units that had proved themselves by superior performance in combat were given the traditional "Guards" title.

These concessions were combined with ruthless discipline: Order No. 227, issued on 28 July 1942, threatened commanders who retreated without orders with punishment by court-martial. Infractions by military and politruks were punished with transferral to penal battalions and to penal companies which carried out especially hazardous duties, such as serving as tramplers to clear Nazi minefields. The order stipulated to capture or shoot "cowards" and fleeing panicked troops at the rear where blocking detachments were ordered to be set up. In the first three months after Order No. 227 was promulgated 1,000 retreating troops were shot and 24,993 were sent to penal battalions. By October 1942, the idea of regular blocking detachments was quietly dropped. By 29 October 1944, the units were officially disbanded.

As it became clear that the Soviet Union would win the war, Stalin ensured that propaganda always mentioned his leadership of the war; he sidelined the victorious generals and never allowed them to develop into political rivals. After the war the Soviets once again purged the Red Army (though not as brutally as in the 1930s) and demoted many successful officers (including Zhukov, Rodion Malinovsky and Ivan Konev) to unimportant positions.

== Repression and genocide in occupied territories ==
... Hitler's first defeats on the frontline outside Moscow drove him to endorse plans for the total extermination of the Jews, and almost simultaneously to openly intensify the anti-Slavic slogans of anti-Bolshevist and anti-Semitic propaganda. Then in 1943 came the call for total war. Total war meant further suffering and murders inflicted on millions. Millions of people perished heirless and nameless.

— Polish historian Jerzy W. Borejsze

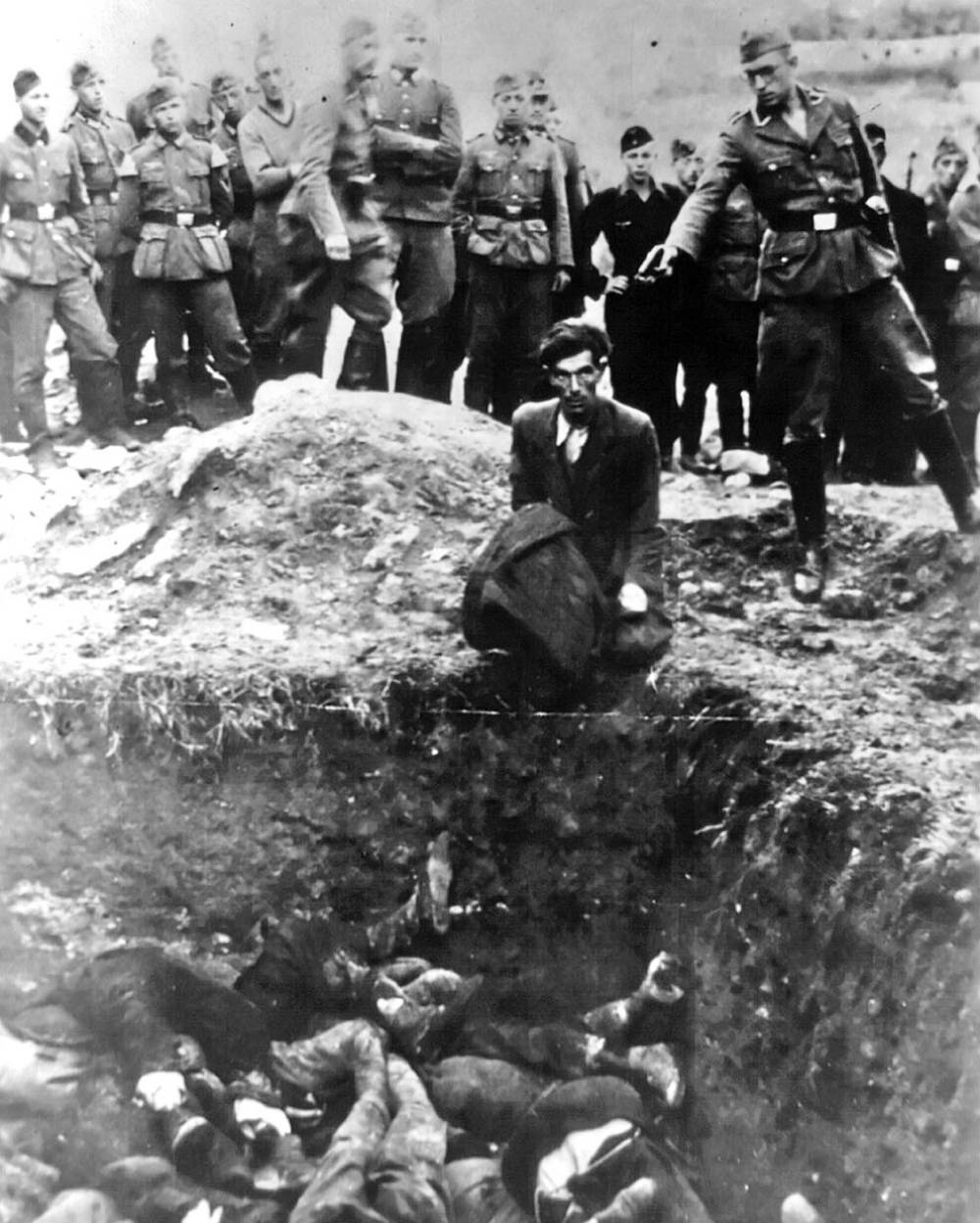
The Last Jew in Vinnitsa. A member of Einsatzgruppe D murders a Jew who is kneeling before a filled mass grave in Vinnitsa, in 1942.

The enormous territorial gains of 1941 presented Germany with vast areas to pacify and administer. For the majority of people of the Soviet Union, the German invasion was viewed as a brutal act of unprovoked aggression. While not all parts of Soviet society viewed the German advance in this way, the majority of the Soviet population viewed German forces as occupiers. In areas such as Estonia, Latvia, and Lithuania (which had been annexed by the Soviet Union in 1940) the Wehrmacht was tolerated by a relatively more significant part of the native population.

This was particularly true for the territories of Western Ukraine, recently rejoined to the Soviet Union, where the anti-Polish and anti-Soviet Ukrainian nationalist underground hoped in vain to establish the "independent state", relying on German armed force. However, Soviet society as a whole was hostile to the invading Nazis from the very start. The nascent national liberation movements among Ukrainians and Cossacks, and others were viewed by Hitler with suspicion; some, especially those from the Baltic States, were co-opted into the Axis armies and others brutally suppressed. None of the conquered territories gained any measure of self-rule.

Instead, the Nazi ideologues saw the future of the East as one of settlement by German colonists, with the natives killed, expelled, or reduced to slave labour. The cruel and brutally inhumane treatment of Soviet civilians, women, children and elderly, the daily bombings of civilian cities and towns, Nazi pillaging of Soviet villages and hamlets and unprecedented harsh punishment and treatment of civilians in general were some of the primary reasons for Soviet resistance to Nazi Germany's invasion. Indeed, the Soviets viewed Germany's invasion as an act of aggression and an attempt to conquer and enslave the local population.

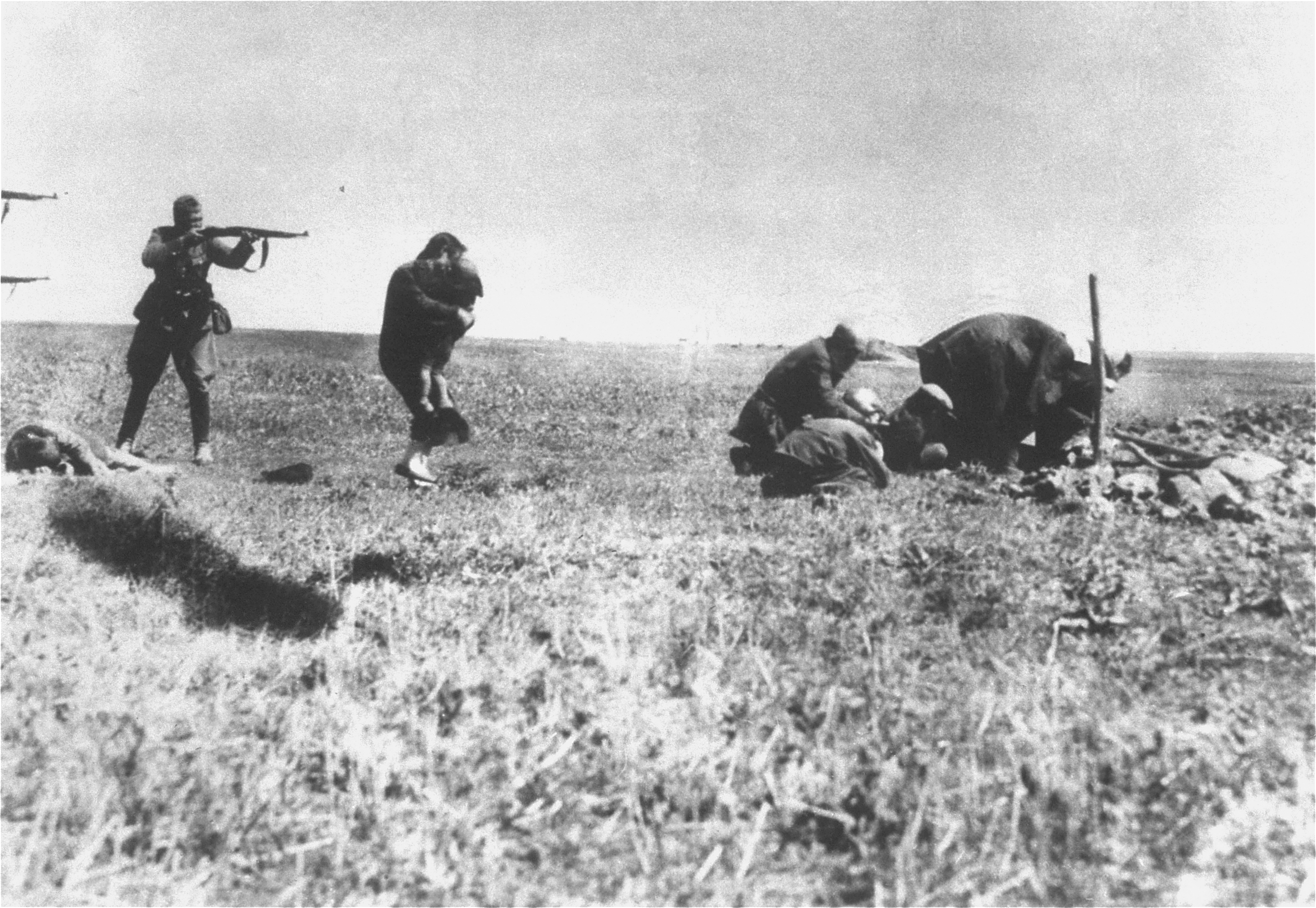
Einsatzgruppen murdering Jews in Ivanhorod, Ukraine, 1942

Regions closer to the front were managed by military powers of the region, in other areas such as the Baltic states annexed by the USSR in 1940, Reichscommissariats were established. As a rule, the maximum in loot was extracted. In September 1941, Erich Koch was appointed to the Ukrainian Commissariat. His opening speech was clear about German policy: "I am known as a brutal dog ... Our job is to suck from Ukraine all the goods we can get hold of ... I am expecting from you the utmost severity towards the native population."

Atrocities against the Jewish population in the conquered areas began almost immediately, with the dispatch of Einsatzgruppen (task groups) to round up Jews and shoot them.

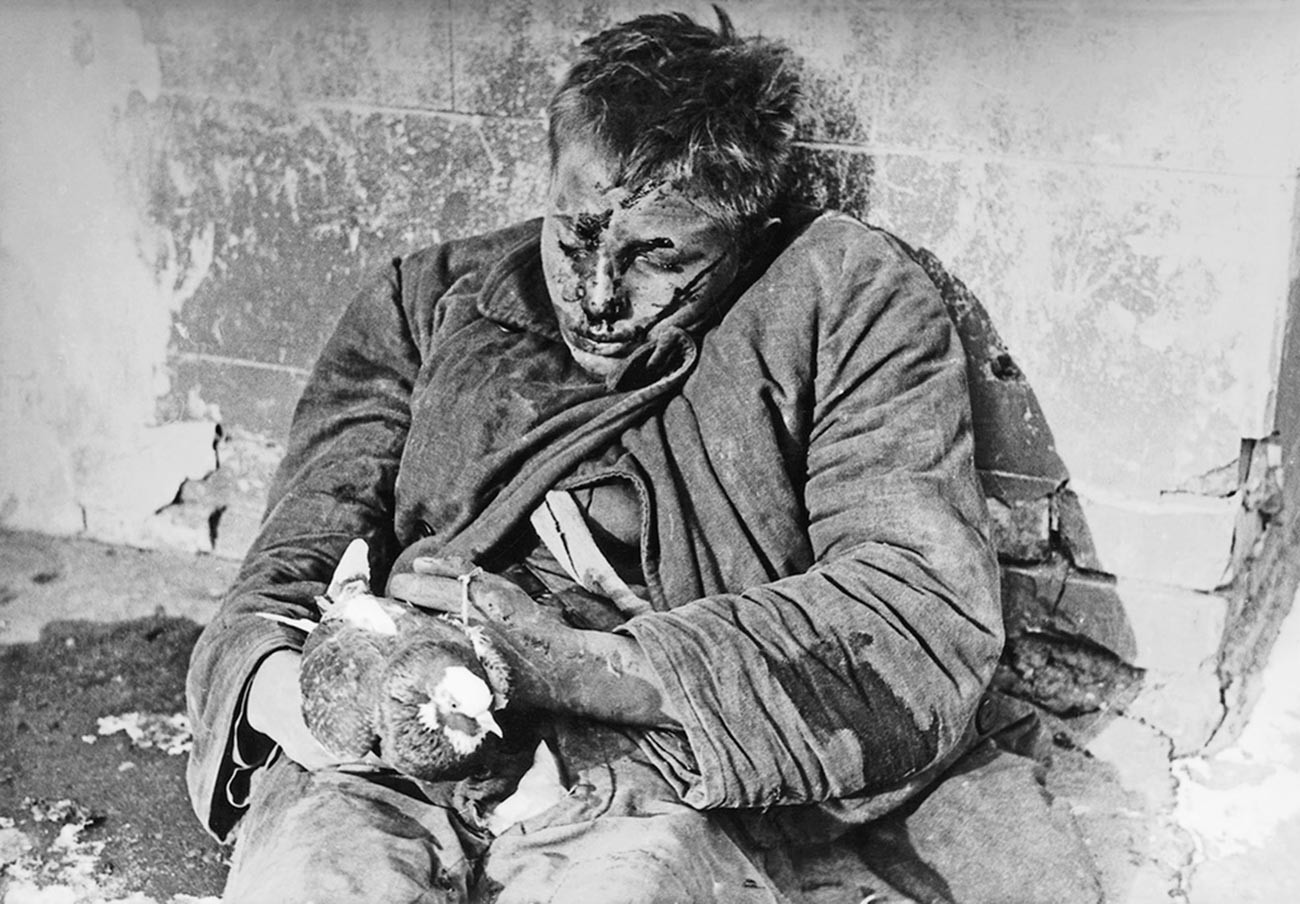
Viktor Cherevihkin, a Soviet teenager killed by German troops occupying Rostov for keeping pigeons

The massacres of Jews and other ethnic minorities were only a part of the deaths from the Nazi occupation. Many hundreds of thousands of Soviet civilians were executed, and millions more died from starvation as the Germans requisitioned food for their armies and fodder for their draft horses. As they retreated from Ukraine and Belarus in 1943–44, the German occupiers systematically applied a scorched earth policy, burning towns and cities, destroying infrastructure, and leaving civilians to starve or die of exposure. (Note: On 7 September 1943, Himmler sent orders to HSSPF "Ukraine" Hans-Adolf Prützmann that "not a human being, not a single head of cattle, not a hundredweight of cereals and not a railway line remain behind; that not a house remains standing, not a mine is available which is not destroyed for years to come, that there is not a well which is not poisoned. The enemy must really find completely burned and destroyed land". He ordered cooperation with Infantry general Staff, also someone named Stampf, and sent copies to the Chief of Regular Police, Chief of Security Police & SS, SS-Obergruppenführer Berger, and the chief of the partisan combating units.) In many towns, the battles were fought within towns and cities with trapped civilians caught in the middle. Estimates of total civilian dead in the Soviet Union in the war range from seven million (Encyclopædia Britannica) to seventeen million (Richard Overy).

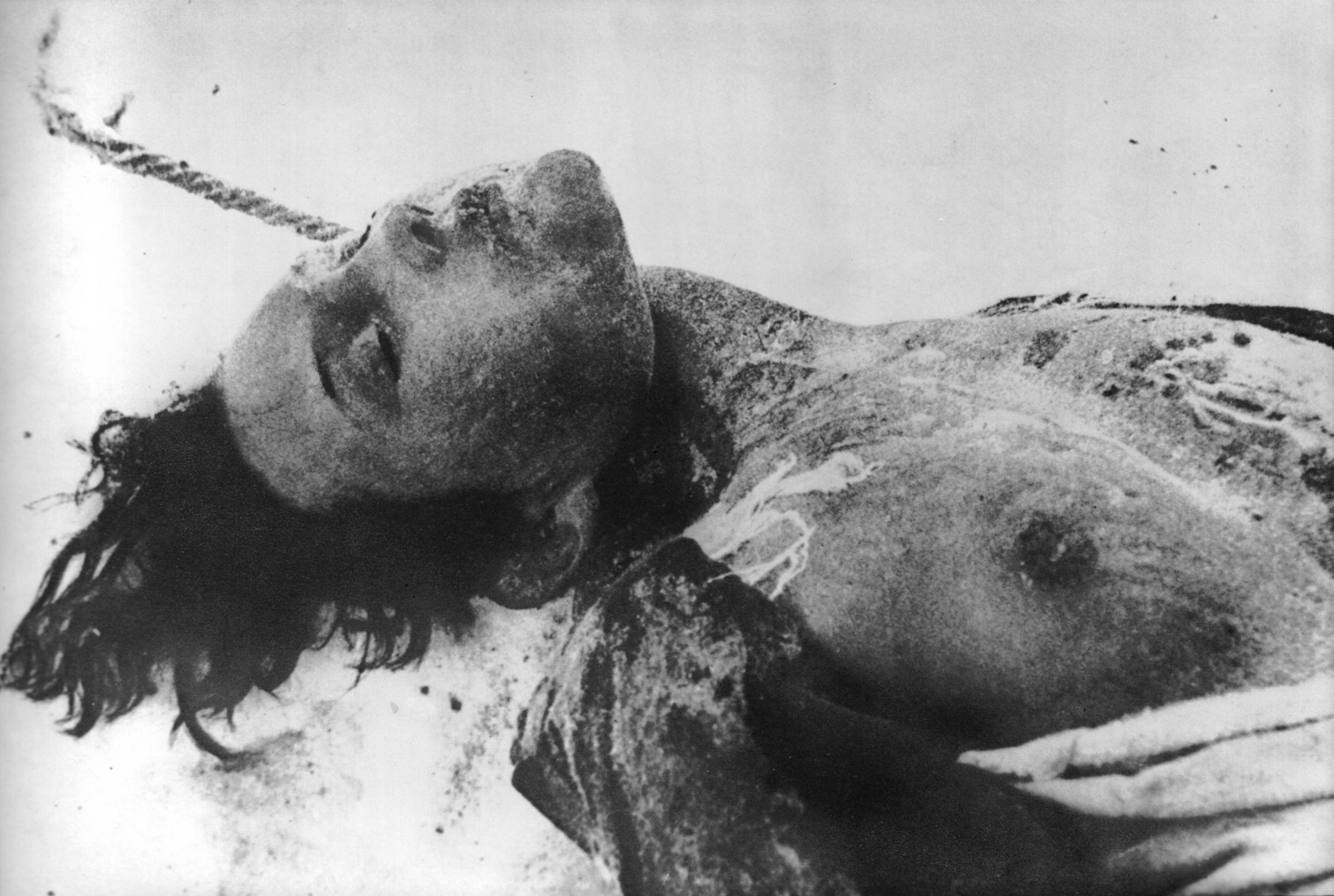
Soviet partisan Zoya Kosmodemyanskaya, hanged by German forces in November 1941

The Nazi ideology and the maltreatment of the local population and Soviet POWs encouraged partisans fighting behind the front; it motivated even anti-communists or non-Russian nationalists to ally with the Soviets and greatly delayed the formation of German-allied divisions consisting of Soviet POWs (see Ostlegionen). These results and missed opportunities contributed to the defeat of the Wehrmacht.

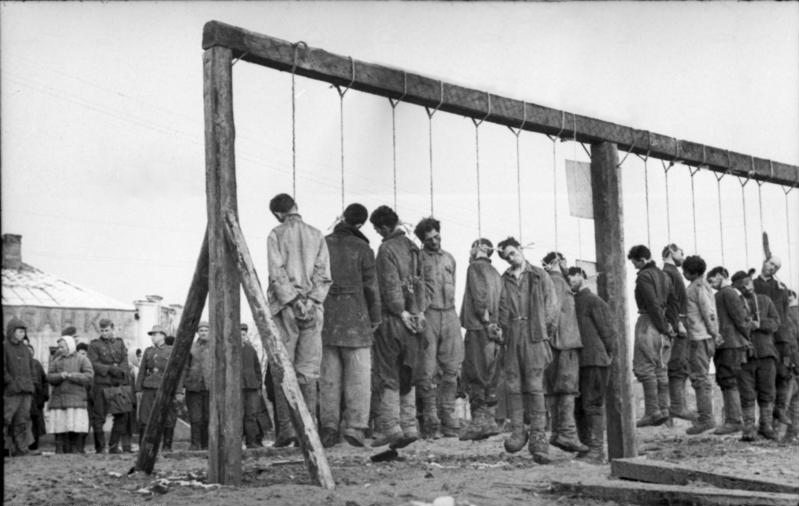
Soviet partisans hanged by German forces in January 1943

Vadim Erlikman has detailed Soviet losses totalling 26.5 million war-related deaths. Military losses of 10.6 million include six million killed or missing in action and 3.6 million POW dead, plus 400,000 paramilitary and Soviet partisan losses. Civilian deaths totalled 15.9 million, which included 1.5 million from military actions; 7.1 million victims of Nazi genocide and reprisals; 1.8 million deported to Germany for forced labour; and 5.5 million famine and disease deaths. Additional famine deaths, which totalled one million during 1946–47, are not included here. These losses are for the entire territory of the USSR including territories annexed in 1939–40.

Belarus lost a quarter of its pre-war population, including practically all its intellectual elite. Following bloody encirclement battles, all of the present-day Belarus territory was occupied by the Germans by the end of August 1941. The Nazis imposed a brutal regime, deporting some 380,000 young people for slave labour, and killing hundreds of thousands (civilians) more. More than 600 villages like Khatyn were burned with their entire population. More than 209 cities and towns (out of 270 total) and 9,000 villages were destroyed. Himmler pronounced a plan according to which 3/4 of the Belarusian population was designated for "eradication" and 1/4 of the racially 'cleaner' population (blue eyes, light hair) would be allowed to serve Germans as slaves.

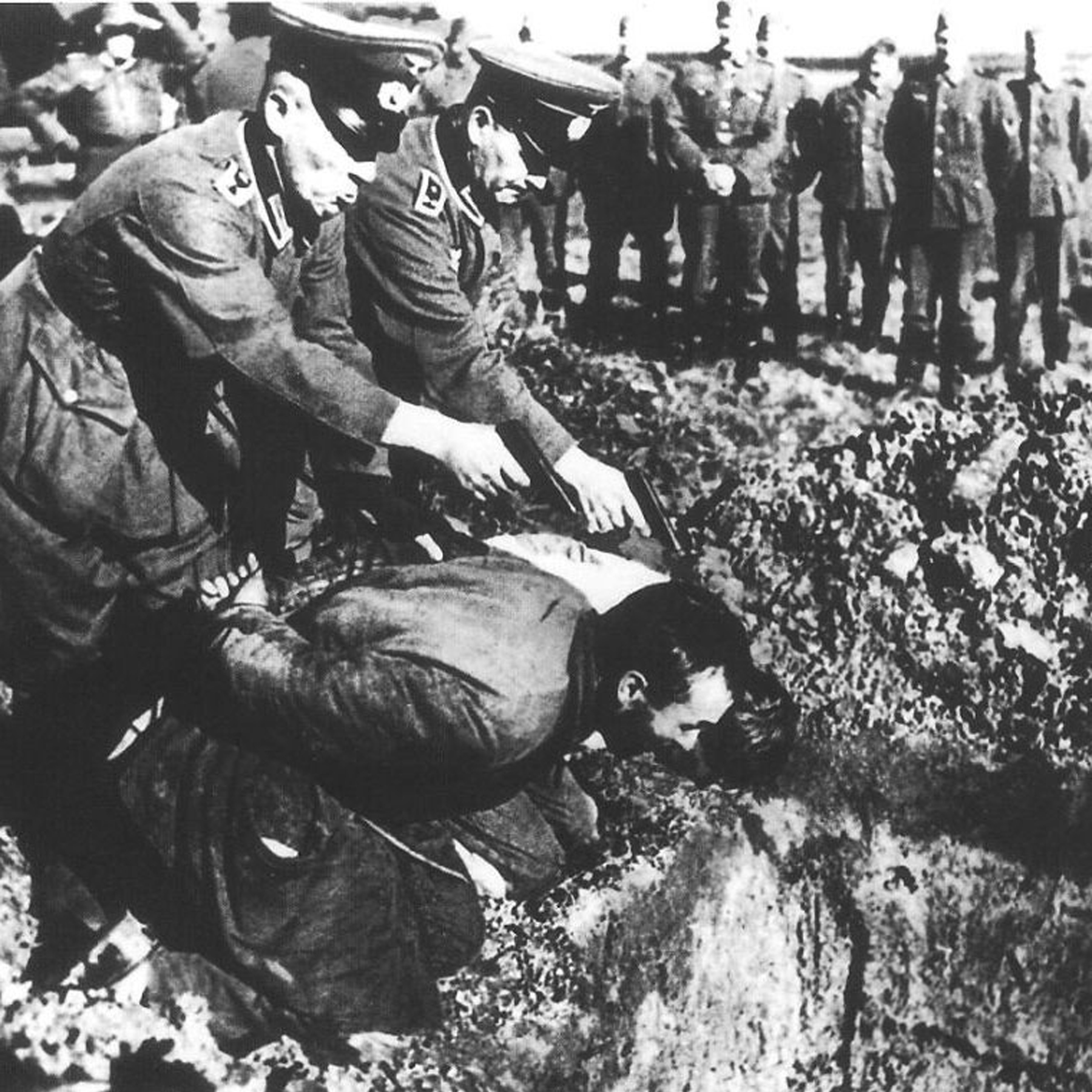
German officers of the 16th Army executing Soviet civilians, 1943

Some recent reports raise the number of Belarusians who perished in the war to "3 million 650 thousand people, unlike the former 2.2 million. That is to say not every fourth inhabitant but almost 40% of the pre-war Belarusian population perished (considering the present-day borders of Belarus)."

Sixty percent of Soviet POWs died during the war. Per the Commissar Order, German soldiers were to immediately execute all Jewish and Communist (party members) POWs upon capture. The remaining Red Army POWs were forced on long death marches with high fatality rates into open air concentration camps, where they were starved to death in the millions.

By its end, large numbers of Soviet POWs, forced labourers and Nazi collaborators (including those who were forcefully repatriated by the Western Allies) went to special NKVD "filtration" camps. By 1946, 80 percent of civilians and 20 percent of POWs were freed, others were re-drafted, or sent to labour battalions. Two percent of civilians and 14 percent of the POWs were sent to the Gulag.

The official Polish government report of war losses prepared in 1947 reported 6,028,000 victims out of a population of 27,007,000 ethnic Poles and Jews; this report excluded ethnic Ukrainian and Belarusian losses.

Although the Soviet Union had not signed the Geneva Convention (1929), it is generally accepted that it considered itself bound by the provisions of the Hague convention. A month after the German invasion in 1941, an offer was made for a reciprocal adherence to Hague convention. This 'note' was left unanswered by Third Reich officials.

Soviet repressions also contributed into the Eastern Front's death toll. Mass repression occurred in the occupied portions of Poland as well as in the Baltic states and Bessarabia. Immediately after the start of the German invasion, the NKVD massacred large numbers of inmates in most of their prisons in Western Belarus and Western Ukraine, while the remainder was to be evacuated in death marches.

== Industrial output ==
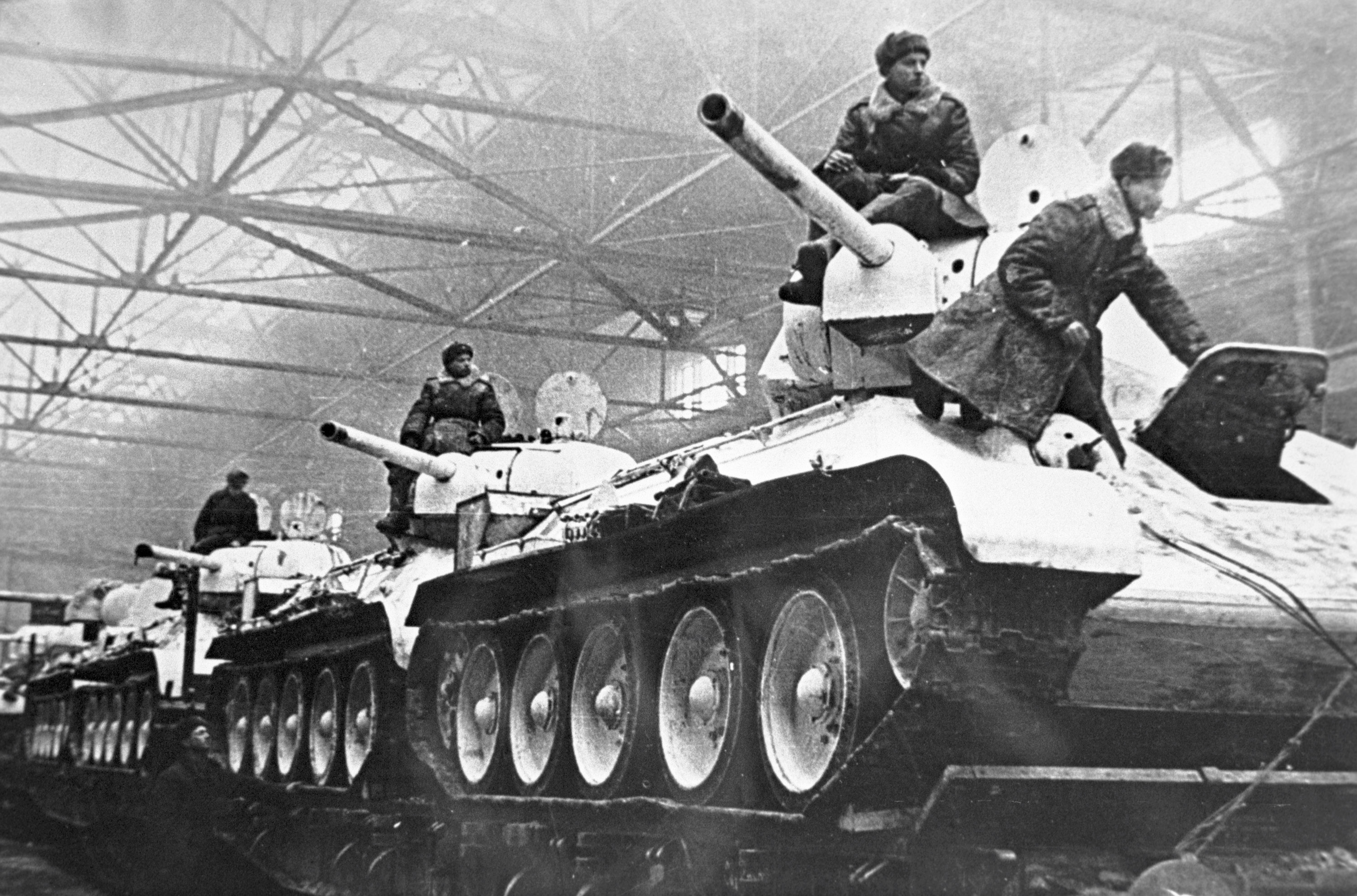
Soviet T-34 tanks being transported from the factory to the front

The Soviet victory owed a great deal to the ability of its war industry to outperform the German economy, despite the enormous loss of population and land. Stalin's five-year plans of the 1930s had resulted in the industrialisation of the Urals and central Asia. In 1941, thousands of trains evacuated critical factories and workers from Belarus and Ukraine to safe areas far from the front lines. Once these facilities were reassembled east of the Urals, production could be resumed without fear of German bombing.

The increases in production of materiel were achieved at the expense of civilian living standards – the most thorough application of the principle of total war – and with the help of Lend-Lease supplies from the United Kingdom and the United States. The Germans, on the other hand, could rely on a large slave workforce from the conquered countries and Soviet POWs. American exports and technical expertise also enabled the Soviets to produce goods that they would not have been able to on their own. For example, while the USSR was able to produce fuel of octane numbers from 70 to 74, Soviet industry only met 4% of demand for fuel of octane numbers from 90+; all aircraft produced after 1939 required fuel of the latter category. To fulfill demands, the USSR depended on American assistance, both in finished products and TEL.

Germany had far greater resources than did the USSR, and dwarfed its production in every matrix except for oil, having over five times the USSR's coal production, over three times its iron production, three times its steel production, twice its electricity production, and about 2/3 of its oil production.

German production of explosives from 1940 to 1944 was 1.595 million tons, along with 829,970 tons of powder. Consumption on all fronts during the same period was 1.493 million tons of explosives and 626,887 tons of powder. From 1941 to 1945, the USSR produced only 505,000 tons of explosives and received 105,000 tons of Lend-Lease imports. Germany outproduced the Soviet Union 3.16 to 1 in explosives tonnage.

Soviet armoured fighting vehicle production was greater than the Germans (in 1943, the Soviet Union manufactured 24,089 tanks and self-propelled guns to Germany's 19,800). The Soviets incrementally upgraded existing designs, and simplified and refined manufacturing processes to increase production, and were helped by a mass infusion of harder to produce goods such as aviation fuel, machine tools, trucks, and high-explosives from Lend-Lease, allowing them to concentrate on a few key industries. Meanwhile, Germany had been cut off from foreign trade for years by the time it invaded the USSR, was in the middle of two extended and costly theatres at air and sea that further limited production (Battle of the Atlantic and Defence of the Reich), and was forced to devote a large segment of its expenditures to goods the Soviets could cut back on (such as trucks) or which would never even be used against the Soviets (such as ships). Naval vessels alone constituted 10–15% of Germany's war expenditures from 1940 to 1944 depending on the year, while armoured vehicles by comparison were only 5–8%.

Summary of German and Soviet raw material production during the war
Year	Coal (million tonnes, Germany includes lignite and bituminous types)		Steel (million tonnes)		Aluminium (thousand tonnes)		Oil (million tonnes)					
Year	German	Soviet	German	Soviet	German	Soviet	German	Soviet	Italian	Hungarian	Romanian	Japanese
1941	483.4	151.4	31.8	17.9	233.6	–	5.7	33.0	0.12	0.4	5.5	–
1942	513.1	75.5	32.1	8.1	264.0	51.7	6.6	22.0	0.01	0.7	5.7	1.8
1943	521.4	93.1	34.6	8.5	250.0	62.3	7.6	18.0	0.01	0.8	5.3	2.3
1944	509.8	121.5	28.5	10.9	245.3	82.7	5.5	18.2	–	1	3.5	1
1945 (Note: Soviet numbers for 1945 are for the whole of 1945, including after the war was over.)	–	149.3	–	12.3	–	86.3	1.3	19.4	–	–	–	0.1

Summary of Axis and Soviet tank and self- propelled gun production during the war
Year	Tanks and self-propelled guns					
Year	Soviet	German	Italian	Hungarian	Romanian	Japanese
1941	6,590	(Note: German figures for 1941 and 1942 include tanks only.) 5,200	595	–	–	595
1942	24,446	9,300	1,252	500	–	557
1943	24,089	19,800	336	500	105	558
1944	28,963	27,300	–	500	105	353
1945	15,400	–	–	–	–	137

Summary of Axis and Soviet aircraft production during the war
Year	Aircraft					
Year	Soviet	German	Italian	Hungarian	Romanian	Japanese
1941	15,735	11,776	3,503	–	1,000	5,088
1942	25,436	15,556	2,818	6	1,000	8,861
1943	34,845	25,527	967	267	1,000	16,693
1944	40,246	39,807	–	773	1,000	28,180
1945	20,052	7,544	–	–	1,000	8,263

Summary of German and Soviet industrial labour (including those classified as handworkers), and summary of foreign, voluntary, coerced and POW labour
Year	Industrial labour		Foreign labour		Total labour	
Year	Soviet	German	Soviet	German	Total Soviet	Total German
1941	11,000,000	12,900,000	–	3,500,000	11,000,000	16,400,000
1942	7,200,000	11,600,000	50,000	4,600,000	7,250,000	16,200,000
1943	7,500,000	11,100,000	200,000	5,700,000	7,700,000	16,800,000
1944	8,200,000	10,400,000	800,000	7,600,000	9,000,000	18,000,000
1945	9,500,000	–	2,900,000	–	12,400,000	–

Soviet production and upkeep was assisted by the Lend-Lease program from the United States and the United Kingdom. In the course of the war the US supplied $11 billion of materiel through Lend-Lease. This included 400,000 trucks, 12,000 armoured vehicles (including 7,000 tanks), 11,400 aircraft and 1.75 million tons of food. The British supplied aircraft including 3,000 Hurricanes and 4,000 other aircraft during the war. Five thousand tanks were provided by the British and Canada. Total British supplies were about four million tons. Germany on the other hand had the resources of conquered Europe at its disposal; those numbers are however not included into the tables above, such as production in France, Belgium, the Netherlands, Denmark, and so on.

After the defeat at Stalingrad, Germany geared completely towards a war economy, as expounded in a speech given by Joseph Goebbels (the Nazi propaganda minister), in the Berlin Sportpalast, increasing production in subsequent years under Albert Speer's (the Reich armaments minister) direction, despite the intensifying Allied bombing campaign.

== Casualties ==
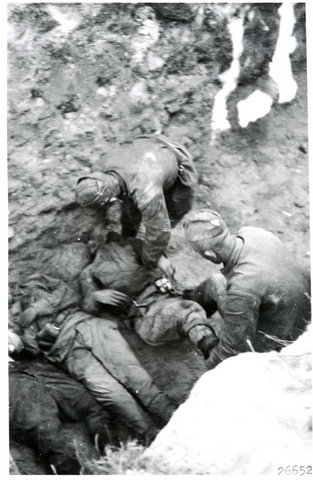
Soviets bury their fallen, July 1944

The fighting involved millions of Axis and Soviet troops along the broadest land front in military history. It was by far the deadliest single theatre of the European portion of World War II with up to 8.7 to 10 million military deaths on the Soviet side (although, depending on the criteria used, casualties in the Far East theatre may have been similar in number). Axis military deaths were 5 million, of which around 4,000,000 were German deaths.

Included in this figure of German losses is the majority of the 2 million German military personnel listed as missing or unaccounted for after the war. Rüdiger Overmans states that it seems entirely plausible, while not provable, that one half of these men were killed in action and the other half died in Soviet custody. Official OKW Casualty Figures list 65% of Heer killed/missing/captured as being lost on the Eastern Front from 1 September 1939, to 1 January 1945 (four months and a week before the conclusion of the war), with front not specified for losses of the Kriegsmarine and Luftwaffe.

Estimated civilian deaths range from about 14 to 17 million. Over 11.4 million Soviet civilians within pre-1939 Soviet borders were killed, and another estimated 3.5 million civilians were killed in the annexed territories. The Nazis exterminated one to two million Soviet Jews (including the annexed territories) as part of the Holocaust. Soviet and Russian historiography often uses the term "irretrievable casualties". According to the Narkomat of Defence order (No. 023, 4 February 1944), the irretrievable casualties include killed, missing, those who died due to war-time or subsequent wounds, maladies and chilblains and those who were captured.

The huge death toll was attributed to several factors, including brutal mistreatment of POWs and captured partisans, the large deficiency of food and medical supplies in Soviet territories, and atrocities committed mostly by the Germans against the civilian population. The multiple battles and the use of scorched earth tactics destroyed agricultural and other infrastructure, and civilian housing, leaving much of the population homeless and without food.

Military losses on the Eastern Front during World War II
Forces fighting with the Axis
	Total Dead	KIA/DOW/MIA	Prisoners taken by the Soviets	Prisoners who died in captivity	WIA (not including DOW)
Greater Germany	est 4,137,000	est 3,637,000	2,733,739–3,000,060	500,000	Unknown
Soviet residents who joined German army	215,000	215,000	400,000+	Unknown	118,127
Romania	281,000	226,000	500,000	55,000	
Hungary	300,000	245,000	500,000	55,000	89,313
Italy	82,000	55,000	70,000	27,000	
Finland	63,204	62,731	3,500	473	158,000
Total	est. 5,078,000	est. 4,437,400	4,264,497–4,530,818	est. 637,000	Unknown

Military losses on the Eastern Front during World War II
Forces fighting with the Soviet Union
	Total Dead	KIA/DOW/MIA	Prisoners taken by the Axis	Prisoners who died in captivity	WIA (not including DOW)
Soviet	8,668,400–10,000,000	6,829,600	4,059,000 (military personnel only)–5,700,000	2,250,000–3,300,000 of which 1,283,200 confirmed	13,581,483
Poland	24,000	24,000	Unknown	Unknown	
Romania	17,000	17,000	80,000	Unknown	
Bulgaria	10,000	10,000	Unknown	Unknown	
Total	Up to ~8,719,000 – 10,000,000	6,880,600	4,139,000–5,780,000	2,250,000–3,300,000	13,581,483

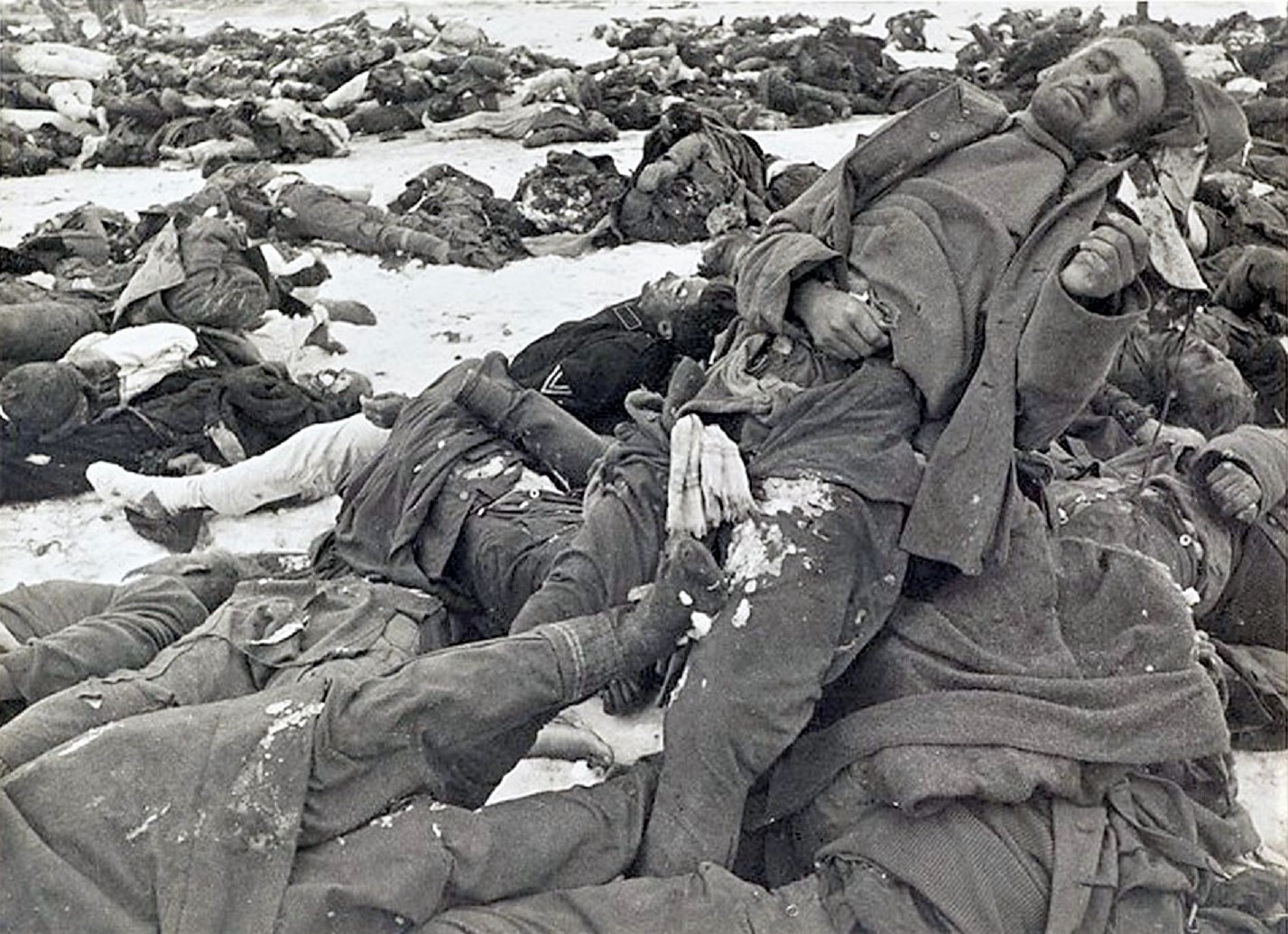
Corpses of German soldiers at a collection point after the Battle of Stalingrad, February 1943

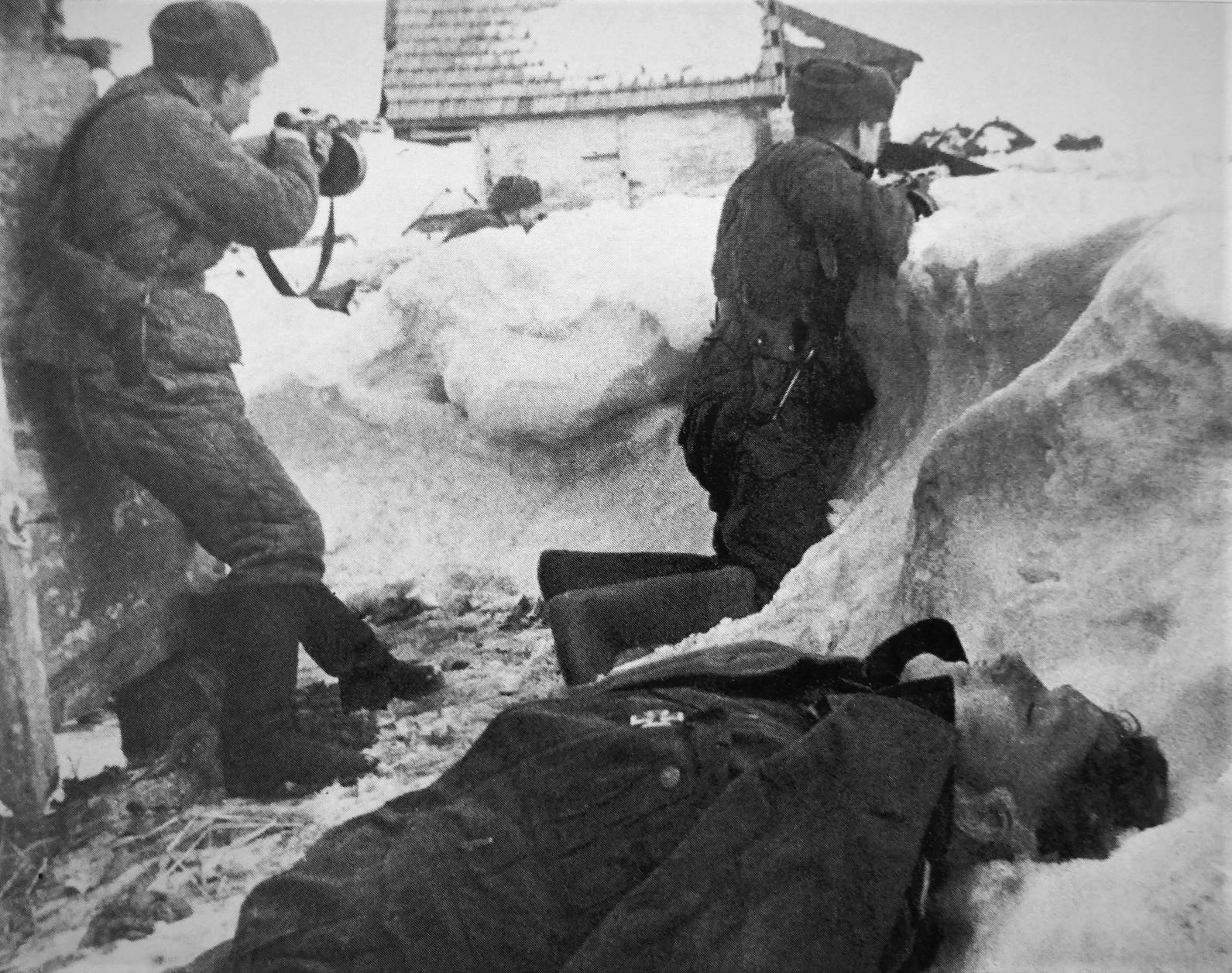
Red Army soldiers in a trench near the corpse of a German soldier, still wearing an Iron Cross, 1942

Based on Soviet sources, Grigori F. Krivosheev put German losses on the Eastern Front from 1941 to 1945 at 6,923,700 men: including killed in action, died of wounds or disease and reported missing and presumed dead – 4,137,100, taken prisoner 2,571,600 and 215,000 dead among Soviet volunteers in the Wehrmacht. Deaths of POW were 450,600 including 356,700 in NKVD camps and 93,900 in transit.

According to a report prepared by the General Staff of the Army issued in December 1944, materiel losses in the East from the period of 22 June 1941 until November 1944 stood at 33,324 armoured vehicles of all types (tanks, assault guns, tank destroyers, self-propelled guns and others). Paul Winter, Defeating Hitler, states "these figures are undoubtedly too low". According to Soviet claims, the Germans lost 42,700 tanks, tank destroyers, self-propelled guns and assault guns on the Eastern front. Overall, Germany produced 3,024 reconnaissance vehicles, 2,450 other armoured vehicles, 21,880 armoured personnel carriers, 36,703 semi-tracked tractors and 87,329 semi-tracked trucks, estimated 2/3 were lost on the Eastern Front.

The Soviets lost 96,500 tanks, tank destroyers, self-propelled guns and assault guns, as well as 37,600 other armoured vehicles (such as armoured cars and semi-tracked trucks) for a total of 134,100 armoured vehicles lost.

The Soviets also lost 102,600 aircraft (combat and non-combat causes), including 46,100 in combat. According to Soviet claims, the Germans lost 75,700 aircraft on the Eastern front.

Polish Armed Forces in the East, initially consisting of Poles from Eastern Poland or otherwise in the Soviet Union in 1939–1941, began fighting alongside the Red Army in 1943, and grew steadily as more Polish territory was liberated from the Nazis in 1944–1945.

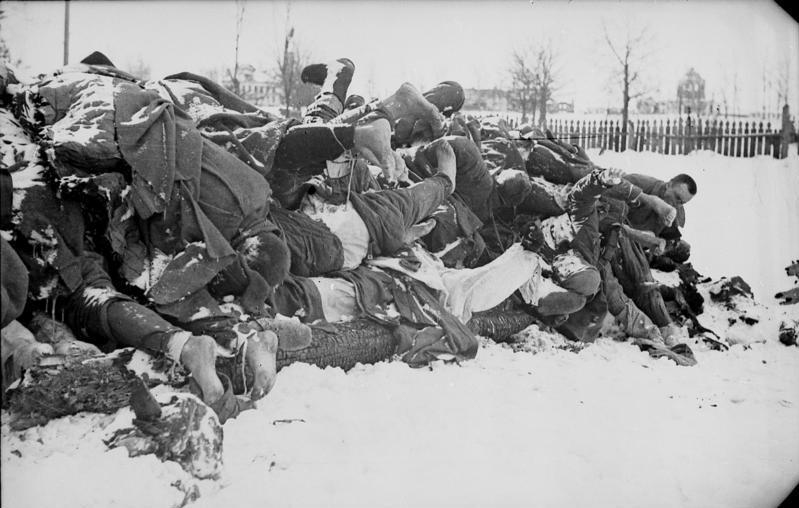
Dead Soviet soldiers in Kholm, January 1942

When the Axis countries of Central Europe were occupied by the Soviets, they changed sides and declared war on Germany (see Allied Commissions).

Some Soviet citizens joined Andrey Vlasov's Russian Liberation Army, Ukrainian Liberation Army, Georgian Legion and other Ostlegionen units. Most of those who joined were Soviet POWs. These foreign volunteers in the Wehrmacht were primarily used in the Eastern Front but some were assigned to guard the beaches of Normandy. The other main group of men joining the German army were citizens of the Baltic countries annexed by the Soviet Union in 1940 or from Western Ukraine. They fought in their own Waffen-SS units, including the Latvian Legion and the Galicia Division.

The Soviet Union also used defectors from the Axis countries in combat. The Red Army had two divisions formed of Romanian POWs, the Tudor Vladimirescu Division and the Horea, Cloșca și Crișan Division; during the Siege of Budapest, some Hungarians joined the Volunteer Regiment of Buda of the Red Army. The USSR did not have a full analogue of the Vlasov Army which would consist of Germans, however, members of the National Committee for a Free Germany, formed mostly of German POWs, were allowed to form small units known as Combat Groups (German: Kampfgruppen) which participated in combat with the Wehrmacht in its rear areas and at the front as an auxiliary force of the Red Army and the Soviet partisans, although combat was not their main purpose. In the Third Reich, members of the National Committee for a Free Germany were known as "Seydlitz Troops", named after Walther von Seydlitz-Kurzbach who had defected to the USSR; there was a widespread myth that he had his own pro-Soviet military formation.

Hitler's notorious Commissar Order called for Soviet political commissars, who were responsible for ensuring that Red Army units remained politically reliable, to be summarily shot when identified amongst captured troops. Axis troops who captured Red Army soldiers frequently shot them in the field or shipped them to concentration camps to be used as forced labourers or killed. Additionally, millions of Soviet civilians were captured as POWs and treated in the same manner. It is estimated that between 2.25 and 3.3 million Soviet POWs died in Nazi custody, out of 5.25–5.7 million. This figure represents a total of 45–57% of all Soviet POWs and may be contrasted with 8,300 deaths out of the 231,000 British and U.S. prisoners, or 3.6%. About 5% of the Soviet prisoners who died were of Jewish ethnicity.

== See also ==
- Barbarossa decree
- Genocide of the Soviet people
- Historiography of World War II
- Horses in World War II
- Kantokuen – Japanese plan to invade the Soviet Far East in 1941
- List of military operations on the Eastern Front of World War II
- Outline of World War II
- Severity Order
- The Battle of Russia – a film from the Why We Fight propaganda film series
- Timeline of the Eastern Front of World War II
- Charles Thau

=== National and regional experiences ===
- Bulgaria during World War II
- Byelorussia in World War II
- Carpathian Ruthenia during World War II
- Estonia in World War II
- Finland in World War II
- German occupation of the Baltic states during World War II
- Hungary in World War II
- Italian participation on the Eastern Front
- Military history of Greece during World War II
- Romania in World War II
- Soviet occupation of the Baltic states (1940)
- Soviet re-occupation of the Baltic states (1944)
- Soviet Union in World War II
- Women in the Russian and Soviet military
- Women in World War II
- World War II in Yugoslavia
