= Ján Takáč =

Slovak long-distance runner

Personal information
- Nationality: Slovak
- Born: 2 February 1909 Choňkovce, Austria-Hungary (today in Sobrance District, Slovakia)
- Died: 18 January 1995 (aged 85) Prague, Czech Republic

Sport
- Sport: Long-distance running
- Event: Marathon
- Club: SK Slavia Praha

Ján Takáč (2 February 1909 – 18 January 1995) was a Slovak long-distance runner. He competed in the marathon at the 1936 Summer Olympics.
