= Orechová =

Village and municipality in Slovakia

Orechová Dióska
- Municipality
- Flag

- Location of Orechová in the Košice Region Location of Orechová in Slovakia
- Coordinates: 48.70°N 22.23°E
- Country: Slovakia
- Region: Košice Region
- District: Sobrance District
- First mentioned: 1299

Area
  - Total: 3.39 km^{2} (1.31 sq mi)
- Elevation: 123 m (404 ft)

Population (2025)
  - Total: 253
- Time zone: UTC+1 (CET)
  - Summer (DST): UTC+2 (CEST)
- Postal code: 725 1
- Area code: +421 56
- Vehicle registration plate (until 2022): SO
- Website: obecorechova.sk

Orechová (Hungarian: Dióska) is a village and municipality in the Sobrance District in the Košice Region of east Slovakia.

== History ==
In historical records the village was first mentioned in 1299.

== Geography ==
The municipality lies at an altitude of 123 metres (404 ft) and covers an area of 3.39 km^{2} (1.31 sq mi) (2025).

== Population ==
Population statistic (10 years)
| Year | 1995 | 2005 | 2015 | 2025 |
|---|---|---|---|---|
| Count | 242 | 251 | 246 | 253 |
| Difference | | +3.71% | −1.99% | +2.84% |

Population statistic
| Year | 2024 | 2025 |
|---|---|---|
| Count | 250 | 253 |
| Difference | | +1.2% |

It has a population of 253 people (31 December 2025).

=== Ethnicity ===
Census 2021 (1+ %)
| Ethnicity | Number | Fraction |
|---|---|---|
| Slovak | 227 | 94.19% |
| Not found out | 7 | 2.9% |
| Ukrainian | 3 | 1.24% |
| Romani | 3 | 1.24% |
| Hungarian | 3 | 1.24% |
| Total | 241 | |

In year 2021 was 241 people by ethnicity 227 as Slovak, 7 as Not found out, 3 as Ukrainian, 3 as Romani, 3 as Hungarian and 2 as Polish.

Note on population: The difference values of population numbers in the table "Population statistic" and in the sections "Ethnicity" & "Religion" is caused by the use of various statistical methods.

=== Religion ===
Census 2021 (1+ %)
| Religion | Number | Fraction |
|---|---|---|
| Greek Catholic Church | 125 | 51.87% |
| Roman Catholic Church | 83 | 34.44% |
| None | 19 | 7.88% |
| Not found out | 6 | 2.49% |
| Evangelical Church | 4 | 1.66% |
| Total | 241 | |

In year 2021 was 241 people by religion 125 from Greek Catholic Church, 83 from Roman Catholic Church, 19 from None, 6 from Not found out, 4 from Evangelical Church, 2 from Calvinist Church, 1 from Eastern Orthodox Church and 1 from Jehovah's Witnesses.
