= Kristy (village) =

Slovak village

Kristy Kereszt
- Municipality
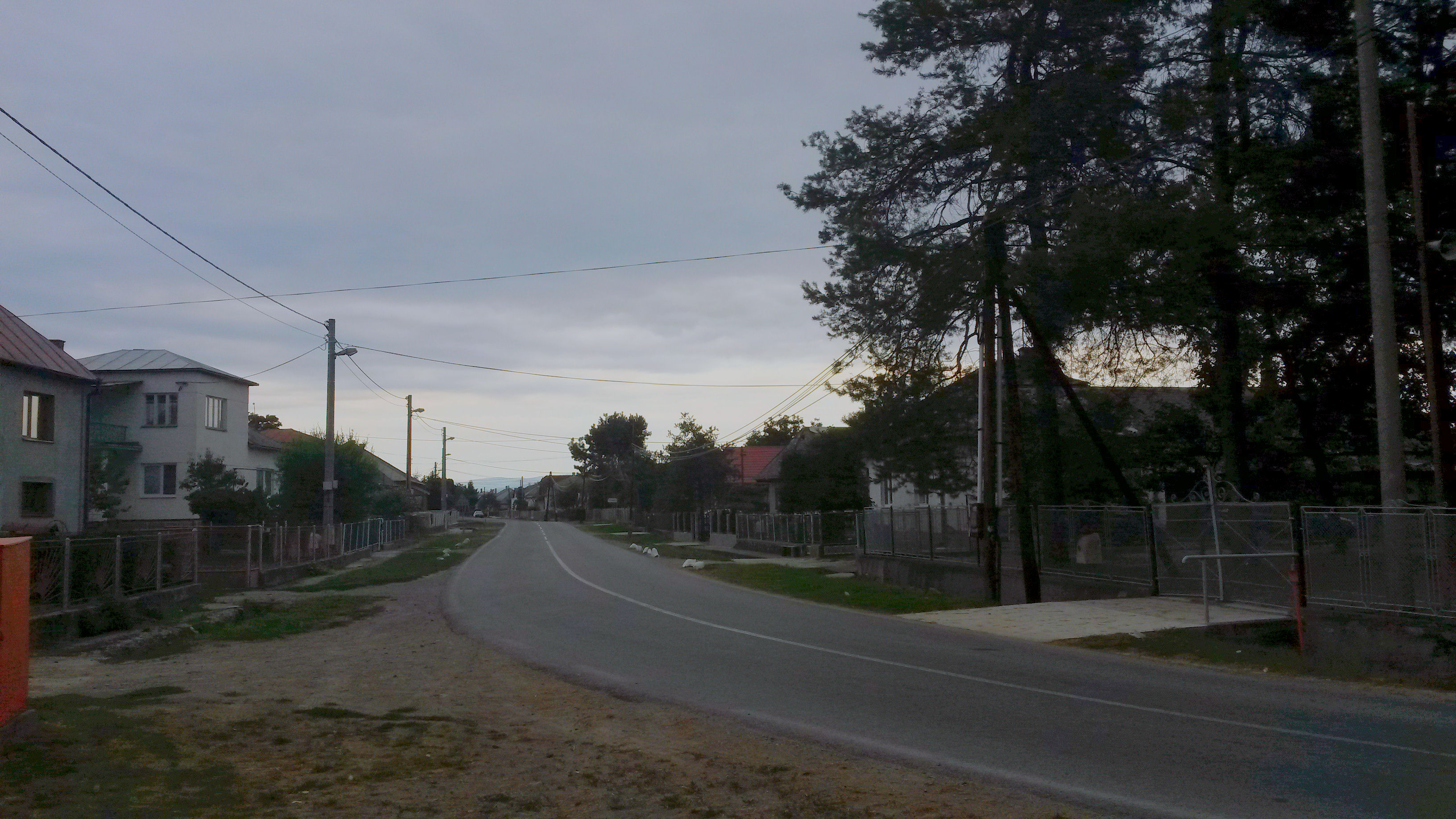

- Flag

- Location of Kristy in the Košice Region Location of Kristy in Slovakia
- Coordinates: 48°41′N 22°11′E
- Country: Slovakia
- Region: Košice Region
- District: Sobrance District
- First mentioned: 1333

Area
  - Total: 7.89 km^{2} (3.05 sq mi)
- Elevation: 108 m (354 ft)

Population (2025)
  - Total: 346
- Time zone: UTC+1 (CET)
  - Summer (DST): UTC+2 (CEST)
- Postal code: 725 5
- Area code: +421 56
- Vehicle registration plate (until 2022): SO
- Website: www.kristy.sk

Kristy (Hungarian: Kereszt) is a small village and municipality in the Sobrance District in the Košice Region of east Slovakia.

== History ==
In historical records the village was first mentioned in 1333.

== Geography ==
The municipality lies at an altitude of 108 metres (354 ft) and covers an area of 7.89 km^{2} (3.05 sq mi) (2025).

== Population ==
Population statistic (10 years)
Year	1995	2005	2015	2025
Count	287	308	310	346
Difference		+7.31%	+0.64%	+11.61%

Population statistic
Year	2024	2025
Count	343	346
Difference		+0.87%

It has a population of 346 people (31 December 2025).

=== Ethnicity ===
Census 2021 (1+%)
Ethnicity	Number	Fraction
Slovak	301	91.21%
Not found out	13	3.93%
Romani	10	3.03%
Ukrainian	5	1.51%
Czech	4	1.21%
Total	330	

In year 2021 was 330 people by ethnicity 301 as Slovak, 13 as Not found out, 10 as Romani, 5 as Ukrainian, 4 as Czech, 1 as Rusyn, 1 as Russian and 1 as Hungarian.

Note on population: The difference values of population numbers in the table "Population statistic" and in the sections "Ethnicity" & "Religion" is caused by the use of various statistical methods.

=== Religion ===
Census 2021 (1+%)
Religion	Number	Fraction
Greek Catholic Church	107	32.42%
Roman Catholic Church	74	22.42%
Calvinist Church	51	15.45%
None	34	10.3%
Apostolic Church	23	6.97%
Not found out	16	4.85%
Eastern Orthodox Church	13	3.94%
Evangelical Church	12	3.64%
Total	330	

In year 2021 was 330 people by religion 107 from Greek Catholic Church, 74 from Roman Catholic Church, 51 from Calvinist Church, 34 from None, 23 from Apostolic Church, 16 from Not found out, 13 from Eastern Orthodox Church and 12 from Evangelical Church.

== Culture ==
The village has a public library.
