= Inovce =

Village and municipality in Slovakia

Inovce Éralja
- Municipality
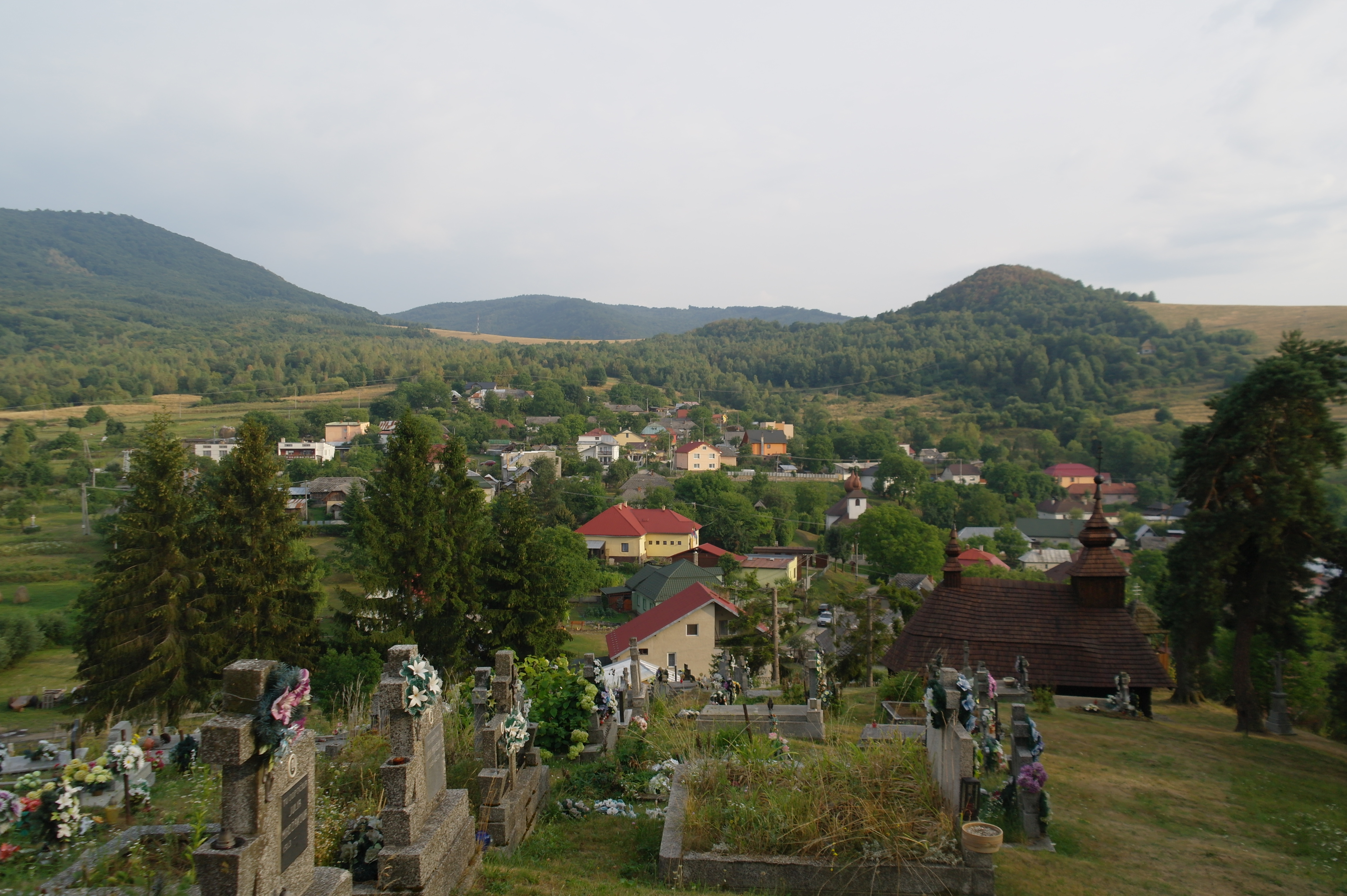

- Flag

- Location of Inovce in the Košice Region Location of Inovce in Slovakia
- Coordinates: 48.83°N 22.37°E
- Country: Slovakia
- Region: Košice Region
- District: Sobrance District
- First mentioned: 1555

Area
  - Total: 10.59 km^{2} (4.09 sq mi)
- Elevation: 485 m (1,591 ft)

Population (2025)
  - Total: 182
- Time zone: UTC+1 (CET)
  - Summer (DST): UTC+2 (CEST)
- Postal code: 726 4
- Area code: +421 56
- Vehicle registration plate (until 2022): SO
- Website: www.inovce.sk

Inovce (Hungarian: Éralja; Rusyn: Иновець) is a village and municipality in the Sobrance District in the Košice Region of east Slovakia.

== History ==
In historical records the village was first mentioned in 1555. Before the establishment of independent Czechoslovakia in 1918, Inovce was part of Zemplén County within the Kingdom of Hungary. In 1939, it was for a short time part of the Slovak Republic. As a result of the Slovak–Hungarian War of 1939, it was again part of Hungary from 1939 to 1944. In the autumn of 1944, the Red Army entered Inovce and it was once again part of Czechoslovakia.

== Geography ==
The municipality lies at an altitude of 485 metres (1,591 ft) and covers an area of 10.59 km^{2} (4.09 sq mi) (2025).

== Population ==
Population statistic (10 years)
Year	1995	2005	2015	2025
Count	276	234	212	182
Difference		−15.21%	−9.40%	−14.15%

Population statistic
Year	2024	2025
Count	189	182
Difference		−3.70%

It has a population of 182 people (31 December 2025).

=== Ethnicity ===
Census 2021 (1+ %)
Ethnicity	Number	Fraction
Slovak	181	87.43%
Rusyn	94	45.41%
Not found out	6	2.89%
Ukrainian	5	2.41%
Total	207	

In year 2021 was 207 people by ethnicity 181 as Slovak, 94 as Rusyn, 6 as Not found out, 5 as Ukrainian and 1 as Czech.

Note on population: The difference values of population numbers in the table "Population statistic" and in the sections "Ethnicity" & "Religion" is caused by the use of various statistical methods.

=== Religion ===
Census 2021 (1+ %)
Religion	Number	Fraction
Eastern Orthodox Church	178	85.99%
Greek Catholic Church	22	10.63%
Not found out	4	1.93%
Total	207	

In year 2021 was 207 people by religion 178 from Eastern Orthodox Church, 22 from Greek Catholic Church, 4 from Not found out, 2 from Roman Catholic Church and 1 from None.

== Culture ==
The village has a public library, and its own police force and fire brigade

== Genealogical resources ==
The records for genealogical research are available at the state archive "Statny Archiv in Presov, Slovakia"

- Roman Catholic church records (births/marriages/deaths): 1783-1895 (parish B)
- Greek Catholic church records (births/marriages/deaths): 1824-1851 (parish B)

== See also ==
- List of municipalities and towns in Slovakia
