= Lekárovce =

Lekárovce Lakárd
- Municipality
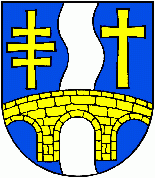
- Flag Coat of arms

- Location of Lekárovce in the Košice Region Location of Lekárovce in Slovakia
- Coordinates: 48.62°N 22.17°E
- Country: Slovakia
- Region: Košice Region
- District: Sobrance District
- First mentioned: 1400

Area
  - Total: 12.35 km^{2} (4.77 sq mi)
- Elevation: 107 m (351 ft)

Population (2025)
  - Total: 835
- Time zone: UTC+1 (CET)
  - Summer (DST): UTC+2 (CEST)
- Postal code: 725 4
- Area code: +421 56
- Vehicle registration plate (until 2022): SO
- Website: www.obeclekarovce.sk

Lekárovce (Hungarian: Lakárd) is a village and municipality in the Sobrance District in the Košice Region of east Slovakia.

== History ==
In historical records the village was first mentioned in 1400. After World War II, the village was transferred to Slovakia from the Zakarpattia Oblast of the Ukrainian Soviet Socialist Republic in 1946.

== Geography ==
The municipality lies at an altitude of 107 metres (351 ft) and covers an area of 12.35 km^{2} (4.77 sq mi) (2025). The Uh river splits the village in two parts.

== Population ==
Population statistic (10 years)
Year	1995	2005	2015	2025
Count	1115	1022	928	835
Difference		−8.34%	−9.19%	−10.02%

Population statistic
Year	2024	2025
Count	835	835
Difference		+0%

It has a population of 835 people (31 December 2025).

=== Ethnicity ===
Census 2021 (1+ %)
Ethnicity	Number	Fraction
Slovak	834	95.86%
Not found out	17	1.95%
Other	16	1.83%
Hungarian	13	1.49%
Total	870	

In year 2021 was 870 people by ethnicity 834 as Slovak, 17 as Not found out, 16 as Other, 13 as Hungarian, 5 as Ukrainian, 2 as Czech, 1 as Rusyn, 1 as Russian and 1 as Canadian.

Note on population: The difference values of population numbers in the table "Population statistic" and in the sections "Ethnicity" & "Religion" is caused by the use of various statistical methods.

=== Religion ===
Census 2021 (1+ %)
Religion	Number	Fraction
Roman Catholic Church	396	45.52%
Greek Catholic Church	350	40.23%
None	60	6.9%
Calvinist Church	24	2.76%
Not found out	15	1.72%
Eastern Orthodox Church	9	1.03%
Total	870	

In year 2021 was 870 people by religion 396 from Roman Catholic Church, 350 from Greek Catholic Church, 60 from None, 24 from Calvinist Church, 15 from Not found out, 9 from Eastern Orthodox Church, 8 from Evangelical Church, 3 from Other and not ascertained christian church, 2 from United Methodist Church, 1 from Paganism and natural spirituality, 1 from Christian Congregations in Slovakia and 1 from Apostolic Church.

== Culture ==
There are currently two active folklore groups in the village – men's Užan and women's Pajtaški. The village has a soccer pitch, a gym and it is also known for its tradition in firemen competitions.
