= Hlivištia =

Village and municipality in Slovakia

Hlivištia Hegygombás
- Municipality
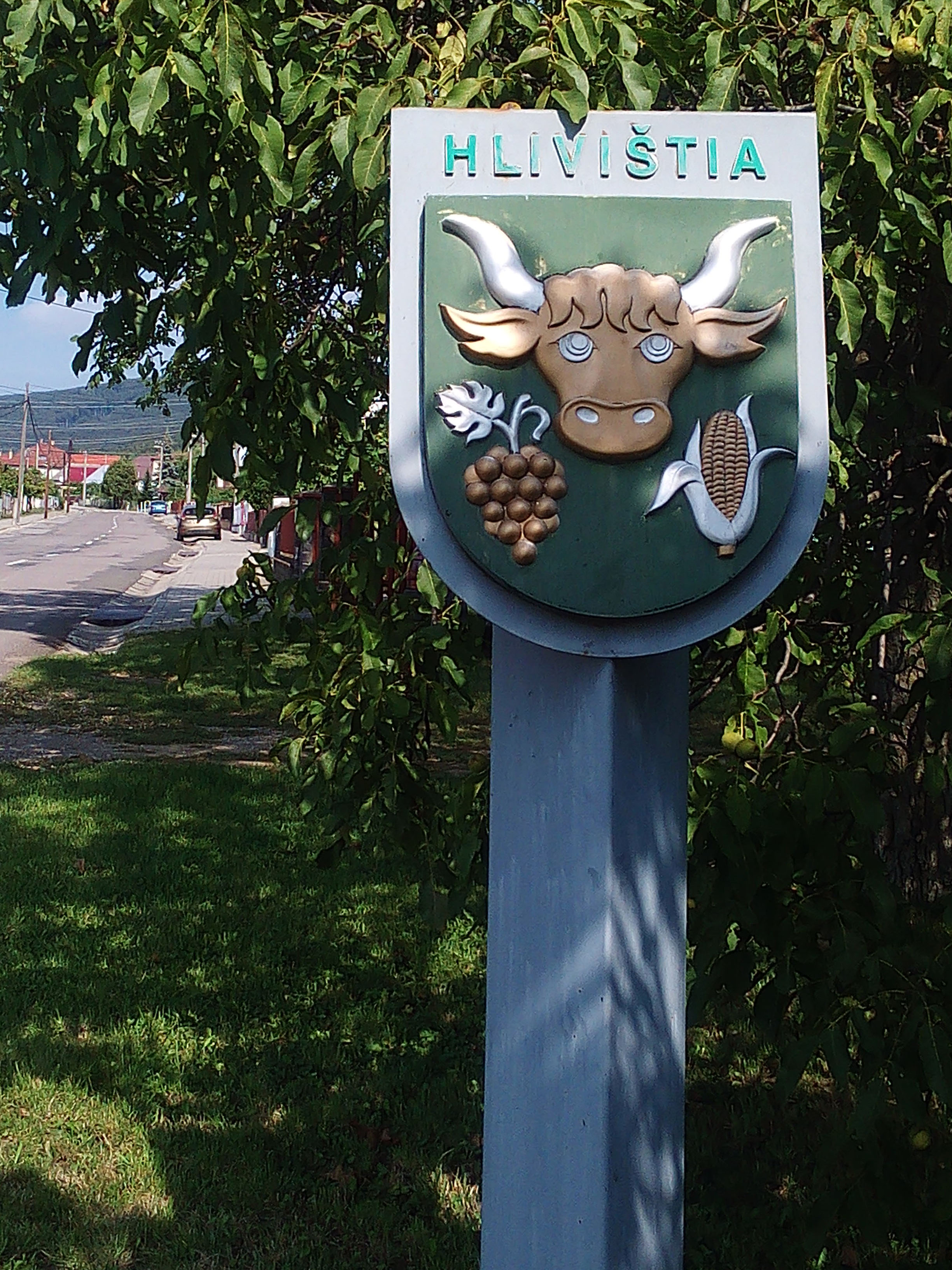

- Flag

- Location of Hlivištia in the Košice Region Location of Hlivištia in Slovakia
- Coordinates: 48.80°N 22.22°E
- Country: Slovakia
- Region: Košice Region
- District: Sobrance District
- First mentioned: 1413

Area
  - Total: 20.20 km^{2} (7.80 sq mi)
- Elevation: 265 m (869 ft)

Population (2025)
  - Total: 350
- Time zone: UTC+1 (CET)
  - Summer (DST): UTC+2 (CEST)
- Postal code: 730 1
- Area code: +421 56
- Vehicle registration plate (until 2022): SO
- Website: www.obechlivistia.sk

Hlivištia (Hungarian: Hegygombás, Rusyn: Гливища) is a village and municipality in the Sobrance District in the Košice Region of east Slovakia.

== History ==
In historical records the village was first mentioned in 1413. Before the establishment of independent Czechoslovakia in 1918, Hlivištia was part of Ung County within the Kingdom of Hungary. In 1939, it was for a short time part of the Slovak Republic. As a result of the Slovak–Hungarian War of 1939, it was again part of Hungary from 1939 to 1944. On 2 November 1944, the Red Army entered Hlivištia and it was once again part of Czechoslovakia.

== Geography ==
The municipality lies at an altitude of 265 metres (869 ft) and covers an area of 20.20 km^{2} (7.80 sq mi) (2025).

== Population ==
Population statistic (10 years)
Year	1995	2005	2015	2025
Count	422	380	381	350
Difference		−9.95%	+0.26%	−8.13%

Population statistic
Year	2024	2025
Count	355	350
Difference		−1.40%

It has a population of 350 people (31 December 2025).

=== Ethnicity ===
Census 2021 (1+ %)
Ethnicity	Number	Fraction
Slovak	362	97.05%
Hungarian	6	1.6%
Ukrainian	5	1.34%
Total	373	

In year 2021 was 373 people by ethnicity 362 as Slovak, 6 as Hungarian, 5 as Ukrainian, 3 as Other, 2 as Not found out, 1 as Czech, 1 as Italian, 1 as Rusyn and 1 as Polish.

Note on population: The difference values of population numbers in the table "Population statistic" and in the sections "Ethnicity" & "Religion" is caused by the use of various statistical methods.

=== Religion ===
Census 2021 (1+ %)
Religion	Number	Fraction
Greek Catholic Church	261	69.97%
Roman Catholic Church	86	23.06%
None	15	4.02%
Eastern Orthodox Church	7	1.88%
Total	373	

In year 2021 was 373 people by religion 261 from Greek Catholic Church, 86 from Roman Catholic Church, 15 from None, 7 from Eastern Orthodox Church, 2 from Not found out, 1 from Paganism and natural spirituality and 1 from Other.

== Culture ==
The village had a public library.

== Genealogical resources ==
The records for genealogical research are available at the state archive "Statny Archiv in Presov, Slovakia"

- Roman Catholic church records (births/marriages/deaths): 1879–1897 (parish B)
- Greek Catholic church records (births/marriages/deaths): 1834–1910 (parish A)

== See also ==
- List of municipalities and towns in Slovakia
