= Horňa =

Village and municipality in Slovakia

Horňa Katlanos
- Municipality
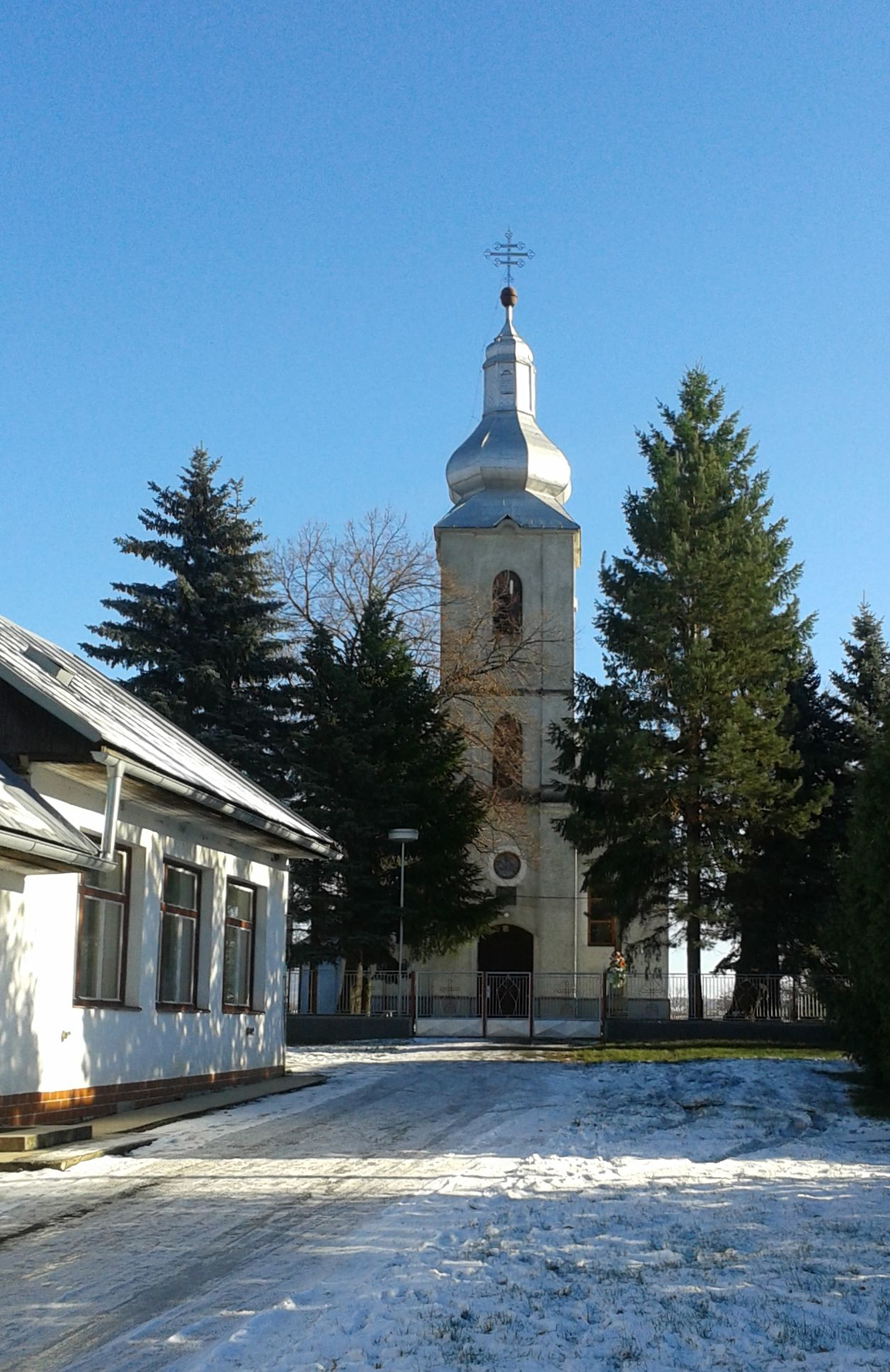
- Church of the Assumption in Horňa

- Flag

- Location of Horňa in the Košice Region Location of Horňa in Slovakia
- Coordinates: 48.77°N 22.20°E
- Country: Slovakia
- Region: Košice Region
- District: Sobrance District
- First mentioned: 1417

Area
  - Total: 6.73 km^{2} (2.60 sq mi)
- Elevation: 141 m (463 ft)

Population (2025)
  - Total: 318
- Time zone: UTC+1 (CET)
  - Summer (DST): UTC+2 (CEST)
- Postal code: 730 1
- Area code: +421 56
- Vehicle registration plate (until 2022): SO
- Website: www.obechorna.sk

Horňa (Hungarian: Katlanos, Rusyn: Горня) is a village and municipality in the Sobrance District in the Košice Region of east Slovakia.

== History ==
In historical records the village was first mentioned in 1417. Before the establishment of independent Czechoslovakia in 1918, Horňa was part of Ung County within the Kingdom of Hungary. In 1939, it was for a short time part of the Slovak Republic. As a result of the Slovak–Hungarian War of 1939, it was again part of Hungary from 1939 to 1944. On 23 November 1944, the Red Army entered Horňa and it was once again part of Czechoslovakia.

== Geography ==
The municipality lies at an altitude of 141 metres (463 ft) and covers an area of 6.73 km^{2} (2.60 sq mi) (2025).

== Population ==
Population statistic (10 years)
Year	1995	2005	2015	2025
Count	386	384	352	318
Difference		−0.51%	−8.33%	−9.65%

Population statistic
Year	2024	2025
Count	325	318
Difference		−2.15%

It has a population of 318 people (31 December 2025).

=== Ethnicity ===
Census 2021 (1+ %)
Ethnicity	Number	Fraction
Slovak	328	97.04%
Not found out	9	2.66%
Rusyn	4	1.18%
Total	338	

In year 2021 was 338 people by ethnicity 328 as Slovak, 9 as Not found out, 4 as Rusyn, 1 as Czech, 1 as Ukrainian and 1 as Canadian.

Note on population: The difference values of population numbers in the table "Population statistic" and in the sections "Ethnicity" & "Religion" is caused by the use of various statistical methods.

=== Religion ===
Census 2021 (1+ %)
Religion	Number	Fraction
Greek Catholic Church	162	47.93%
Roman Catholic Church	149	44.08%
Eastern Orthodox Church	9	2.66%
None	9	2.66%
Not found out	7	2.07%
Total	338	

In year 2021 was 338 people by religion 162 from Greek Catholic Church, 149 from Roman Catholic Church, 9 from Eastern Orthodox Church, 9 from None, 7 from Not found out, 1 from Calvinist Church and 1 from Evangelical Church.

== Culture ==
The village has a public library.

== Genealogical resources ==
The records for genealogical research are available at the state archive "Statny Archiv in Presov, Slovakia"

- Greek Catholic church records (births/marriages/deaths): 1834–1910 (parish B)

== See also ==
- List of municipalities and towns in Slovakia
