= Tašuľa =

Tašuľa Tasolya
- Municipality
- Flag

- Location of Tašuľa in the Košice Region Location of Tašuľa in Slovakia
- Coordinates: 48.65°N 22.18°E
- Country: Slovakia
- Region: Košice Region
- District: Sobrance District
- First mentioned: 1288

Area
  - Total: 6.02 km^{2} (2.32 sq mi)
- Elevation: 104 m (341 ft)

Population (2025)
  - Total: 204
- Time zone: UTC+1 (CET)
  - Summer (DST): UTC+2 (CEST)
- Postal code: 725 2
- Area code: +421 56
- Vehicle registration plate (until 2022): SO
- Website: www.tasula.sk

Tašuľa (Hungarian: Tasolya) is a small village in Sobrance District, Košice Region in eastern Slovakia. As of 2011, it had 201 inhabitants. It is 5 km distant from the seat of district, Sobrance

== Geography ==
The municipality lies at an altitude of 104 metres (341 ft) and covers an area of 6.02 km^{2} (2.32 sq mi) (2025).

== Population ==
Population statistic (10 years)
Year	1995	2005	2015	2025
Count	215	221	188	204
Difference		+2.79%	−14.93%	+8.51%

Population statistic
Year	2024	2025
Count	204	204
Difference		+0%

It has a population of 204 people (31 December 2025).

=== Ethnicity ===
Census 2021 (1+ %)
Ethnicity	Number	Fraction
Slovak	190	95.47%
Romani	13	6.53%
Not found out	8	4.02%
Ukrainian	3	1.5%
Total	199	

In year 2021 was 199 people by ethnicity 190 as Slovak, 13 as Romani, 8 as Not found out, 3 as Ukrainian, 1 as Czech, 1 as Rusyn and 1 as Hungarian.

Note on population: The difference values of population numbers in the table "Population statistic" and in the sections "Ethnicity" & "Religion" is caused by the use of various statistical methods.

=== Religion ===
Census 2021 (1+ %)
Religion	Number	Fraction
Roman Catholic Church	51	25.63%
Calvinist Church	49	24.62%
Jehovah's Witnesses	43	21.61%
Greek Catholic Church	21	10.55%
None	19	9.55%
Not found out	7	3.52%
Eastern Orthodox Church	4	2.01%
Christian Congregations in Slovakia	2	1.01%
Evangelical Church	2	1.01%
Total	199	

In year 2021 was 199 people by religion 51 from Roman Catholic Church, 49 from Calvinist Church, 43 from Jehovah's Witnesses, 21 from Greek Catholic Church, 19 from None, 7 from Not found out, 4 from Eastern Orthodox Church, 2 from Christian Congregations in Slovakia, 2 from Evangelical Church and 1 from Ad hoc movements.
