= Vojnatina =

Vojnatina Vajna
- Municipality
- Flag

- Location of Vojnatina in the Košice Region Location of Vojnatina in Slovakia
- Coordinates: 48.73°N 22.23°E
- Country: Slovakia
- Region: Košice Region
- District: Sobrance District
- First mentioned: 1336

Area
  - Total: 7.70 km^{2} (2.97 sq mi)
- Elevation: 128 m (420 ft)

Population (2025)
  - Total: 241
- Time zone: UTC+1 (CET)
  - Summer (DST): UTC+2 (CEST)
- Postal code: 726 1
- Area code: +421 56
- Vehicle registration plate (until 2022): SO
- Website: www.vojnatina.sk

Vojnatina (Hungarian: Vajna) is a village and municipality in the Sobrance District in the Košice Region of east Slovakia.

== History ==
In historical records the village was first mentioned in 1336.

== Geography ==
The municipality lies at an altitude of 128 metres (420 ft) and covers an area of 7.70 km^{2} (2.97 sq mi) (2025).

== Population ==
Population statistic (10 years)
Year	1995	2005	2015	2025
Count	258	235	244	241
Difference		−8.91%	+3.82%	−1.22%

Population statistic
Year	2024	2025
Count	232	241
Difference		+3.87%

It has a population of 241 people (31 December 2025).

=== Ethnicity ===
Census 2021 (1+ %)
Ethnicity	Number	Fraction
Slovak	243	98.78%
Total	246	

In year 2021 was 246 people by ethnicity 243 as Slovak, 2 as Not found out and 1 as Ukrainian.

Note on population: The difference values of population numbers in the table "Population statistic" and in the sections "Ethnicity" & "Religion" is caused by the use of various statistical methods.

=== Religion ===
Census 2021 (1+ %)
Religion	Number	Fraction
Roman Catholic Church	145	58.94%
Greek Catholic Church	78	31.71%
None	14	5.69%
Christian Congregations in Slovakia	3	1.22%
Total	246	

In year 2021 was 246 people by religion 145 from Roman Catholic Church, 78 from Greek Catholic Church, 14 from None, 3 from Christian Congregations in Slovakia, 2 from Calvinist Church, 2 from Not found out, 1 from Eastern Orthodox Church and 1 from Evangelical Church.

== Facilities ==
The village has a public library a gymnasium and a soccer pitch.
