= Ruský Hrabovec =

Municipality of Slovakia

Ruský Hrabovec Nagygereblyés
- Municipality
- Flag

- Location of Ruský Hrabovec in the Košice Region Location of Ruský Hrabovec in Slovakia
- Coordinates: 48.85°N 22.35°E
- Country: Slovakia
- Region: Košice Region
- District: Sobrance District
- First mentioned: 1567

Area
  - Total: 16.85 km^{2} (6.51 sq mi)
- Elevation: 274 m (899 ft)

Population (2025)
  - Total: 272
- Time zone: UTC+1 (CET)
  - Summer (DST): UTC+2 (CEST)
- Postal code: 726 4
- Area code: +421 56
- Vehicle registration plate (until 2022): SO
- Website: obecruskyhrabovec.sk

Ruský Hrabovec (Hungarian: Nagygereblyés) is a village and municipality in the Sobrance District in the Košice Region of east Slovakia.

== History ==
In historical records the village was first mentioned in 1567.

== Geography ==
The municipality lies at an altitude of 274 metres (899 ft) and covers an area of 16.85 km^{2} (6.51 sq mi) (2025).

== Population ==
Population statistic (10 years)
Year	1995	2005	2015	2025
Count	360	366	309	272
Difference		+1.66%	−15.57%	−11.97%

Population statistic
Year	2024	2025
Count	277	272
Difference		−1.80%

It has a population of 272 people (31 December 2025).

=== Ethnicity ===
Census 2021 (1+ %)
Ethnicity	Number	Fraction
Slovak	255	87.32%
Rusyn	107	36.64%
Not found out	11	3.76%
Ukrainian	7	2.39%
Total	292	

In year 2021 was 292 people by ethnicity 255 as Slovak, 107 as Rusyn, 11 as Not found out, 7 as Ukrainian, 1 as Czech, 1 as Romani and 1 as Hungarian.

Note on population: The difference values of population numbers in the table "Population statistic" and in the sections "Ethnicity" & "Religion" is caused by the use of various statistical methods.

=== Religion ===
Census 2021 (1+ %)
Religion	Number	Fraction
Eastern Orthodox Church	193	66.1%
Greek Catholic Church	73	25%
None	11	3.77%
Roman Catholic Church	9	3.08%
Not found out	6	2.05%
Total	292	

In year 2021 was 292 people by religion 193 from Eastern Orthodox Church, 73 from Greek Catholic Church, 11 from None, 9 from Roman Catholic Church and 6 from Not found out.

== Facilities ==
The village has a public library, and a football pitch.
