= Fekišovce =

Fekišovce Fekésháza
- Municipality
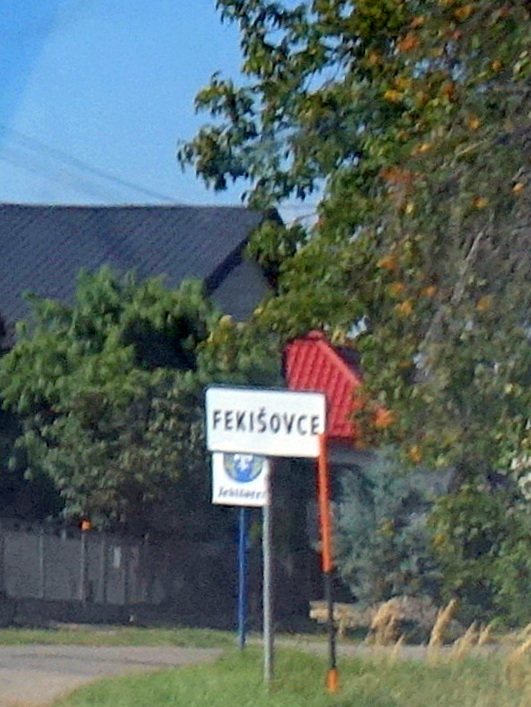

- Flag

- Location of Fekišovce in the Košice Region Location of Fekišovce in Slovakia
- Coordinates: 48.77°N 22.08°E
- Country: Slovakia
- Region: Košice Region
- District: Sobrance District
- First mentioned: 1391

Area
  - Total: 4.75 km^{2} (1.83 sq mi)
- Elevation: 118 m (387 ft)

Population (2025)
  - Total: 294
- Time zone: UTC+1 (CET)
  - Summer (DST): UTC+2 (CEST)
- Postal code: 723 3
- Area code: +421 56
- Vehicle registration plate (until 2022): SO
- Website: www.fekisovce.sk

Fekišovce (Hungarian: Fekésháza, Rusyn: Фекішівцї) is a village and municipality in the Sobrance District in the Košice Region of east Slovakia.

== History ==
In historical records the village was first mentioned in 1391. Before the establishment of independent Czechoslovakia in 1918, Fekišovce was part of Ung County within the Kingdom of Hungary. From 1939 to 1944, it was part of the Slovak Republic. In the autumn of 1944, the Red Army dislodged the Wehrmacht from Fekišovce and it was once again part of Czechoslovakia.

== Geography ==
The municipality lies at an altitude of 118 metres (387 ft) and covers an area of 4.75 km^{2} (1.83 sq mi) (2025).

== Population ==
Population statistic (10 years)
Year	1995	2005	2015	2025
Count	276	311	308	294
Difference		+12.68%	−0.96%	−4.54%

Population statistic
Year	2024	2025
Count	295	294
Difference		−0.33%

It has a population of 294 people (31 December 2025).

=== Ethnicity ===
Census 2021 (1+ %)
Ethnicity	Number	Fraction
Slovak	283	97.58%
Rusyn	8	2.75%
Not found out	6	2.06%
Romani	3	1.03%
Total	290	

In year 2021 was 290 people by ethnicity 283 as Slovak, 8 as Rusyn, 6 as Not found out, 3 as Romani, 2 as Czech, 1 as Ukrainian, 1 as Austrian and 1 as Polish.

Note on population: The difference values of population numbers in the table "Population statistic" and in the sections "Ethnicity" & "Religion" is caused by the use of various statistical methods.

=== Religion ===
Census 2021 (1+ %)
Religion	Number	Fraction
Roman Catholic Church	173	59.66%
Greek Catholic Church	47	16.21%
None	30	10.34%
Eastern Orthodox Church	14	4.83%
Evangelical Church	9	3.1%
Calvinist Church	6	2.07%
Not found out	5	1.72%
Jehovah's Witnesses	3	1.03%
Total	290	

In year 2021 was 290 people by religion 173 from Roman Catholic Church, 47 from Greek Catholic Church, 30 from None, 14 from Eastern Orthodox Church, 9 from Evangelical Church, 6 from Calvinist Church, 5 from Not found out, 3 from Jehovah's Witnesses, 2 from Islam and 1 from Buddhism.

== Culture ==
The village has a public library.

== Local Politics ==
Despite its small population, the village became well known in Slovakia after the inaugural municipal council meeting on 10 December 2018. During the meeting, the local mayor Miloslava Fedorová was very strict to her colleagues and treated them like incompetent children. The council meeting was seen by many third parties as chaotic and absurd; her interactions with her council members were highly antagonistic, with her forcing the council members to sing the national anthem, overriding their unanimous decisions, or refusing to accept their oath of office unless they've recited it standing up.

The YouTube video of the council meeting went viral on the Slovak internet. The story was covered in major Slovak media outlets, and started a discussion about the political culture in the country. The incident spawned a number of jokes and memes. Slovak Lines, a company operating bus transport, even offered a special trip to Fekišovce for the next municipal council meeting. The offer was posted on the company's Facebook page, and encouraged people to sign up for the trip.

== Genealogical resources ==
The records for genealogical research are available at the state archive "Štátny archív in Prešov, Slovakia"

- Greek Catholic church records (births/marriages/deaths): 1805–1937 (parish B)

== See also ==
- List of municipalities and towns in Slovakia
