= Ruskovce, Sobrance District =

Village and municipality in Slovakia

Ruskovce Törökruszka
- Municipality
- Flag

- Location of Ruskovce in the Košice Region Location of Ruskovce in Slovakia
- Coordinates: 48.77°N 22.17°E
- Country: Slovakia
- Region: Košice Region
- District: Sobrance District
- First mentioned: 1418

Area
  - Total: 6.63 km^{2} (2.56 sq mi)
- Elevation: 143 m (469 ft)

Population (2025)
  - Total: 236
- Time zone: UTC+1 (CET)
  - Summer (DST): UTC+2 (CEST)
- Postal code: 730 1
- Area code: +421 56
- Vehicle registration plate (until 2022): SO
- Website: obec-ruskovce.sk

Ruskovce (Hungarian: Törökruszka) is a village and municipality in the Sobrance District in the Košice Region of east Slovakia.

== Population ==
Population statistic (10 years)
Year	1995	2005	2015	2025
Count	231	239	265	236
Difference		+3.46%	+10.87%	−10.94%

Population statistic
Year	2024	2025
Count	236	236
Difference		+0%

It has a population of 236 people (31 December 2025).

=== Ethnicity ===
Census 2021 (1+ %)
Ethnicity	Number	Fraction
Slovak	241	95.63%
Rusyn	10	3.96%
Not found out	9	3.57%
Total	252	

In year 2021 was 252 people by ethnicity 241 as Slovak, 10 as Rusyn, 9 as Not found out, 2 as Ukrainian, 1 as Romani, 1 as Hungarian and 1 as English.

Note on population: The difference values of population numbers in the table "Population statistic" and in the sections "Ethnicity" & "Religion" is caused by the use of various statistical methods.

=== Religion ===
Census 2021 (1+ %)
Religion	Number	Fraction
Greek Catholic Church	138	54.76%
Roman Catholic Church	69	27.38%
None	30	11.9%
Not found out	8	3.17%
Eastern Orthodox Church	4	1.59%
Total	252	

In year 2021 was 252 people by religion 138 from Greek Catholic Church, 69 from Roman Catholic Church, 30 from None, 8 from Not found out, 4 from Eastern Orthodox Church, 2 from Jehovah's Witnesses and 1 from Calvinist Church.
