= Svätuš =

Svätuš Szenteske
- Municipality
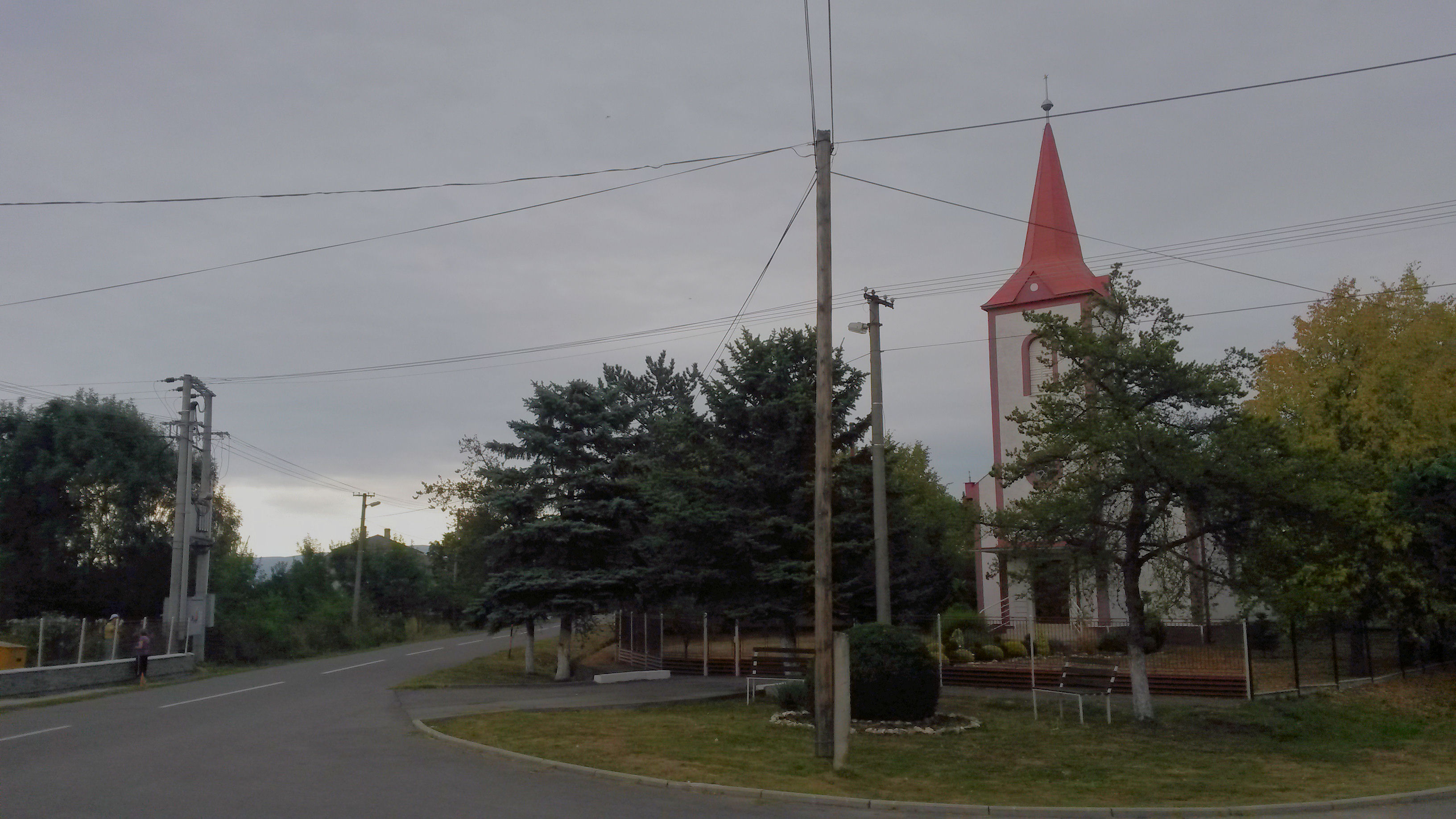

- Flag

- Location of Svätuš in the Košice Region Location of Svätuš in Slovakia
- Coordinates: 48.68°N 22.13°E
- Country: Slovakia
- Region: Košice Region
- District: Sobrance District
- First mentioned: 1386

Area
  - Total: 3.85 km^{2} (1.49 sq mi)
- Elevation: 103 m (338 ft)

Population (2025)
  - Total: 95
- Time zone: UTC+1 (CET)
  - Summer (DST): UTC+2 (CEST)
- Postal code: 725 5
- Area code: +421 56
- Vehicle registration plate (until 2022): SO
- Website: obecsvatus.sk

Svätuš (Hungarian: Szenteske) is a village and municipality in the Sobrance District in the Košice Region of east Slovakia.

== History ==
In historical records the village was first mentioned in 1386.

== Geography ==
The municipality lies at an altitude of 103 metres (338 ft) and covers an area of 3.85 km^{2} (1.49 sq mi) (2025).

== Population ==
Population statistic (10 years)
Year	1995	2005	2015	2025
Count	146	118	113	95
Difference		−19.17%	−4.23%	−15.92%

Population statistic
Year	2024	2025
Count	97	95
Difference		−2.06%

It has a population of 95 people (31 December 2025).

=== Ethnicity ===
Census 2021 (1+ %)
Ethnicity	Number	Fraction
Slovak	102	97.14%
Total	105	

In year 2021 was 105 people by ethnicity 102 as Slovak, 1 as Czech, 1 as Austrian and 1 as Hungarian.

Note on population: The difference values of population numbers in the table "Population statistic" and in the sections "Ethnicity" & "Religion" is caused by the use of various statistical methods.

=== Religion ===
Census 2021 (1+ %)
Religion	Number	Fraction
Calvinist Church	55	52.38%
Roman Catholic Church	20	19.05%
Jehovah's Witnesses	11	10.48%
None	7	6.67%
Greek Catholic Church	5	4.76%
Evangelical Church	5	4.76%
Total	105	

In year 2021 was 105 people by religion 55 from Calvinist Church, 20 from Roman Catholic Church, 11 from Jehovah's Witnesses, 7 from None, 5 from Greek Catholic Church, 5 from Evangelical Church, 1 from Eastern Orthodox Church and 1 from Seventh-day Adventist Church.

== Facilities ==
The village has a public library and a soccer pitch.
