= Krčava =

Village and municipality in Slovakia

Krčava Karcsava
- Municipality
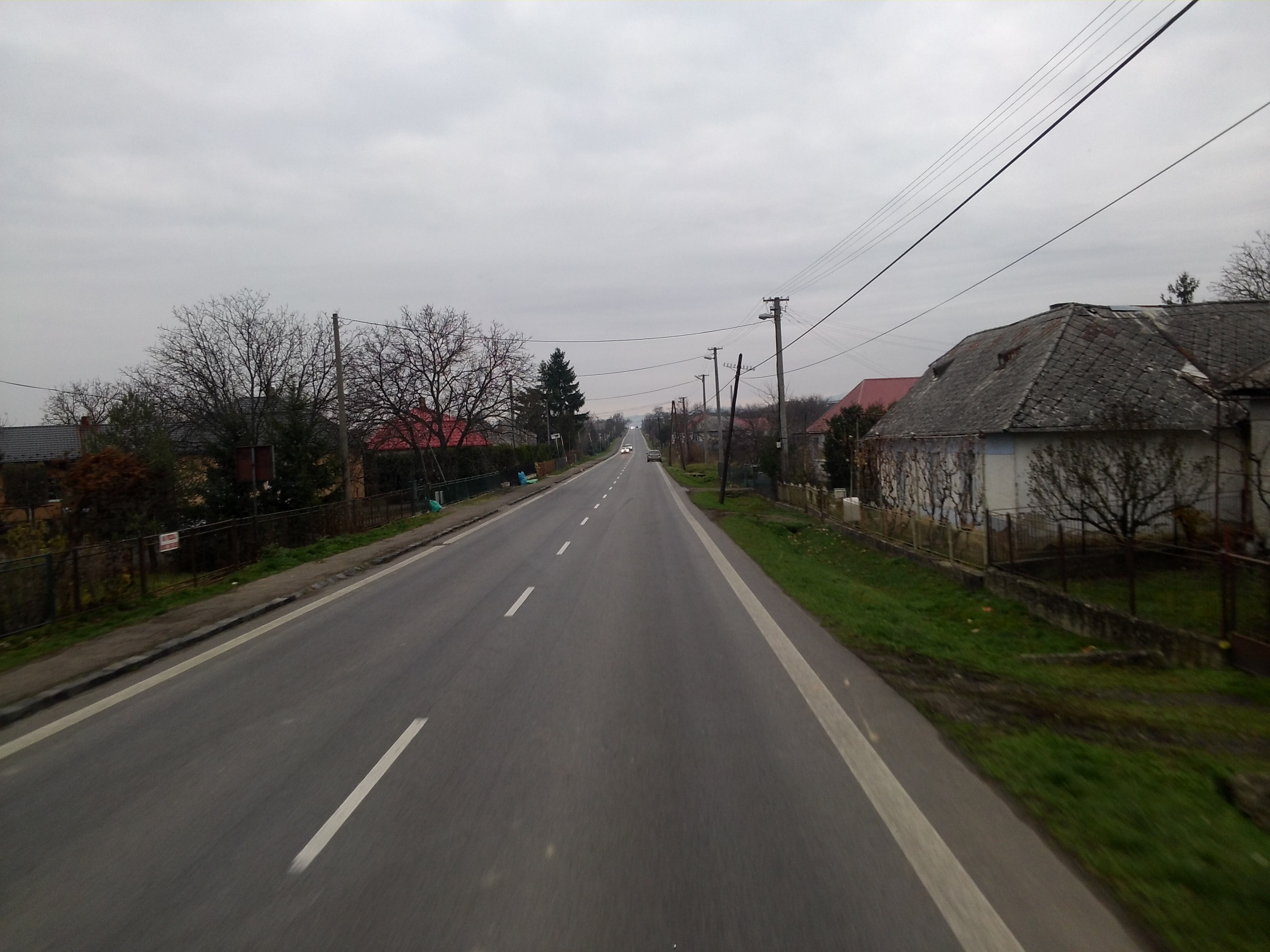

- Flag

- Location of Krčava in the Košice Region Location of Krčava in Slovakia
- Coordinates: 48.67°N 22.25°E
- Country: Slovakia
- Region: Košice Region
- District: Sobrance District
- First mentioned: 1302

Area
  - Total: 8.73 km^{2} (3.37 sq mi)
- Elevation: 129 m (423 ft)

Population (2025)
  - Total: 436
- Time zone: UTC+1 (CET)
  - Summer (DST): UTC+2 (CEST)
- Postal code: 725 1
- Area code: +421 56
- Vehicle registration plate (until 2022): SO
- Website: www.krcava.sk

Krčava (Hungarian: Karcsava) is a village and municipality in the Sobrance District in the Košice Region of east Slovakia.

== History ==
In historical records the village was first mentioned in 1302.

== Geography ==
The municipality lies at an altitude of 129 metres (423 ft) and covers an area of 8.73 km^{2} (3.37 sq mi) (2025).

== Population ==
Population statistic (10 years)
Year	1995	2005	2015	2025
Count	439	441	418	436
Difference		+0.45%	−5.21%	+4.30%

Population statistic
Year	2024	2025
Count	434	436
Difference		+0.46%

It has a population of 436 people (31 December 2025).

=== Ethnicity ===
Census 2021 (1+ %)
Ethnicity	Number	Fraction
Slovak	364	86.46%
Not found out	34	8.07%
Hungarian	11	2.61%
Ukrainian	9	2.13%
Total	421	

In year 2021 was 421 people by ethnicity 364 as Slovak, 34 as Not found out, 11 as Hungarian, 9 as Ukrainian, 3 as Czech, 3 as Rusyn, 3 as Russian and 2 as German.

Note on population: The difference values of population numbers in the table "Population statistic" and in the sections "Ethnicity" & "Religion" is caused by the use of various statistical methods.

=== Religion ===
Census 2021 (1+ %)
Religion	Number	Fraction
Roman Catholic Church	186	44.18%
Greek Catholic Church	148	35.15%
None	33	7.84%
Not found out	31	7.36%
Eastern Orthodox Church	6	1.43%
Christian Congregations in Slovakia	6	1.43%
Evangelical Church	5	1.19%
Total	421	

In year 2021 was 421 people by religion 186 from Roman Catholic Church, 148 from Greek Catholic Church, 33 from None, 31 from Not found out, 6 from Eastern Orthodox Church, 6 from Christian Congregations in Slovakia, 5 from Evangelical Church, 3 from Calvinist Church and 3 from Jehovah's Witnesses.

== Culture ==
The village has a public library, a gym and a football pitch.
