= Porúbka, Sobrance District =

Porúbka Ördögvágás
- Municipality
- Flag

- Location of Porúbka in the Košice Region Location of Porúbka in Slovakia
- Coordinates: 48.73°N 22.26°E
- Country: Slovakia
- Region: Košice Region
- District: Sobrance District
- First mentioned: 1411

Area
  - Total: 10.82 km^{2} (4.18 sq mi)
- Elevation: 172 m (564 ft)

Population (2025)
  - Total: 392
- Time zone: UTC+1 (CET)
  - Summer (DST): UTC+2 (CEST)
- Postal code: 726 1
- Area code: +421 56
- Vehicle registration plate (until 2022): SO
- Website: porubka.webnode.sk

Porúbka (Hungarian: Ördögvágás) is a village and municipality in the Sobrance District in the Košice Region of east Slovakia.

== History ==
In historical records the village was first mentioned in 1411.

== Geography ==
The municipality lies at an altitude of 172 metres (564 ft) and covers an area of 10.82 km^{2} (4.18 sq mi) (2025).

== Population ==
Population statistic (10 years)
Year	1995	2005	2015	2025
Count	477	458	418	392
Difference		−3.98%	−8.73%	−6.22%

Population statistic
Year	2024	2025
Count	400	392
Difference		−2%

It has a population of 392 people (31 December 2025).

=== Ethnicity ===
Census 2021 (1+ %)
Ethnicity	Number	Fraction
Slovak	401	98.52%
Total	407	

In year 2021 was 407 people by ethnicity 401 as Slovak, 4 as Ukrainian, 3 as Rusyn, 3 as English, 2 as Czech and 2 as Hungarian.

Note on population: The difference values of population numbers in the table "Population statistic" and in the sections "Ethnicity" & "Religion" is caused by the use of various statistical methods.

=== Religion ===
Census 2021 (1+ %)
Religion	Number	Fraction
Roman Catholic Church	216	53.07%
Greek Catholic Church	161	39.56%
None	13	3.19%
Eastern Orthodox Church	5	1.23%
Evangelical Church	5	1.23%
Total	407	

In year 2021 was 407 people by religion 216 from Roman Catholic Church, 161 from Greek Catholic Church, 13 from None, 5 from Eastern Orthodox Church, 5 from Evangelical Church, 2 from Calvinist Church, 2 from Christian Congregations in Slovakia, 1 from Not found out, 1 from Church of the Brethren and 1 from Ad hoc movements.

== Culture ==
The village has a public library and a soccer pitch.
