= Blatné Remety =

Village and municipality in Slovakia

Blatné Remety Sárosremete
- Municipality
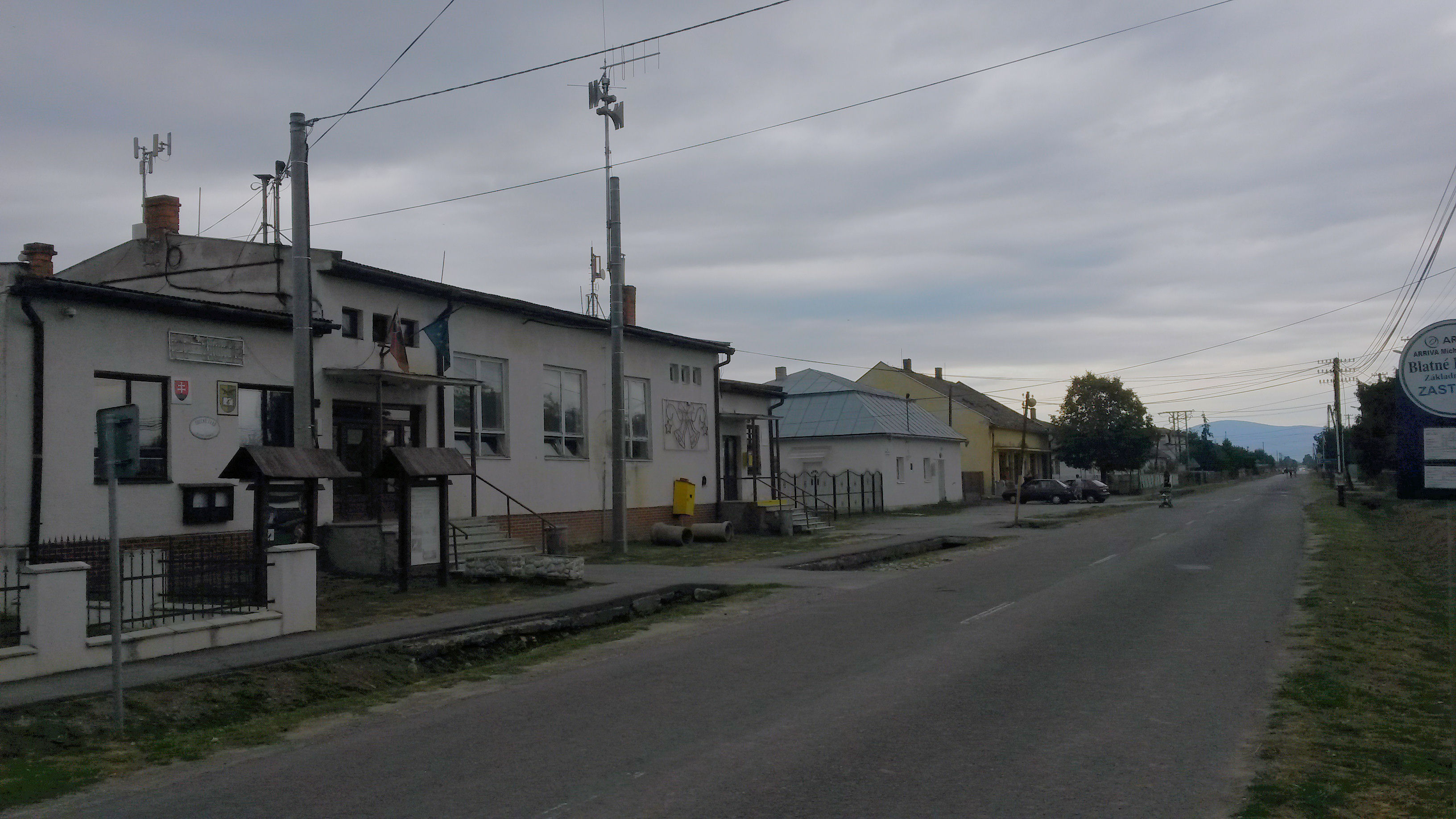

- Flag

- Location of Blatné Remety in the Košice Region Location of Blatné Remety in Slovakia
- Coordinates: 48.70°N 22.12°E
- Country: Slovakia
- Region: Košice Region
- District: Sobrance District
- First mentioned: 1340

Area
  - Total: 6.22 km^{2} (2.40 sq mi)
- Elevation: 103 m (338 ft)

Population (2025)
  - Total: 625
- Time zone: UTC+1 (CET)
  - Summer (DST): UTC+2 (CEST)
- Postal code: 724 4
- Area code: +421 56
- Vehicle registration plate (until 2022): SO
- Website: www.blatneremety.sk

Blatné Remety (Hungarian: Sárosremete, Rusyn: Блатны Реметы) is a village and municipality in the Sobrance District in the Košice Region of east Slovakia.

== History ==
In historical records the village was first mentioned in 1340. Before the establishment of independent Czechoslovakia in 1918, Blatné Remety was part of Ung County within the Kingdom of Hungary. In 1939, it was for a short time part of the Slovak Republic. As a result of the Slovak–Hungarian War of 1939, it was again part of Hungary from 1939 to 1944. In the autumn of 1944, the Red Army entered Blatné Remety and it was once again part of Czechoslovakia.

== Geography ==
The municipality lies at an altitude of 103 metres (338 ft) and covers an area of 6.22 km^{2} (2.40 sq mi) (2025).

== Population ==
Population statistic (10 years)
| Year | 1995 | 2005 | 2015 | 2025 |
|---|---|---|---|---|
| Count | 445 | 512 | 676 | 625 |
| Difference | | +15.05% | +32.03% | −7.54% |

Population statistic
| Year | 2024 | 2025 |
|---|---|---|
| Count | 626 | 625 |
| Difference | | −0.15% |

It has a population of 625 people (31 December 2025).

=== Ethnicity ===
Census 2021 (1+ %)
| Ethnicity | Number | Fraction |
|---|---|---|
| Slovak | 539 | 83.05% |
| Romani | 334 | 51.46% |
| Not found out | 62 | 9.55% |
| Total | 649 | |

In year 2021 was 649 people by ethnicity 539 as Slovak, 334 as Romani, 62 as Not found out, 3 as Czech, 3 as Rusyn, 1 as Ukrainian and 1 as Hungarian.

Note on population: The difference values of population numbers in the table "Population statistic" and in the sections "Ethnicity" & "Religion" is caused by the use of various statistical methods.

The vast majority of the municipality's population consists of the local Roma community. In 2019, they constituted an estimated 99% of the local population.

=== Religion ===
Census 2021 (1+ %)
| Religion | Number | Fraction |
|---|---|---|
| Greek Catholic Church | 290 | 44.68% |
| Jehovah's Witnesses | 75 | 11.56% |
| None | 70 | 10.79% |
| Roman Catholic Church | 65 | 10.02% |
| Eastern Orthodox Church | 51 | 7.86% |
| Not found out | 51 | 7.86% |
| Calvinist Church | 27 | 4.16% |
| Seventh-day Adventist Church | 8 | 1.23% |
| Total | 649 | |

In year 2021 was 649 people by religion 290 from Greek Catholic Church, 75 from Jehovah's Witnesses, 70 from None, 65 from Roman Catholic Church, 51 from Eastern Orthodox Church, 51 from Not found out, 27 from Calvinist Church, 8 from Seventh-day Adventist Church, 4 from Church of the Brethren, 3 from Evangelical Church, 2 from Other and not ascertained christian church, 2 from Christian Congregations in Slovakia and 1 from Other.

== Culture ==
The village has a public library a gym and a football pitch.

== Genealogical resources ==
The records for genealogical research are available at the state archive "Statny Archiv in Presov, Slovakia"

- Greek Catholic church records (births/marriages/deaths): 1834–1895 (parish B)
- Reformated church records (births/marriages/deaths): 1797–1916 (parish B)

== See also ==
- List of municipalities and towns in Slovakia
