= Sejkov =

Municipality in Slovakia

Sejkov Székó
- Municipality
- Flag

- Location of Sejkov in the Košice Region Location of Sejkov in Slovakia
- Coordinates: 48.68°N 22.23°E
- Country: Slovakia
- Region: Košice Region
- District: Sobrance District
- First mentioned: 1412

Area
  - Total: 7.02 km^{2} (2.71 sq mi)
- Elevation: 116 m (381 ft)

Population (2025)
  - Total: 205
- Time zone: UTC+1 (CET)
  - Summer (DST): UTC+2 (CEST)
- Postal code: 725 1
- Area code: +421 56
- Vehicle registration plate (until 2022): SO
- Website: www.sejkov.sk

Sejkov (Hungarian: Székó) is a village and municipality in the Sobrance District in the Košice Region of east Slovakia.

== History ==
In historical records the village was first mentioned in 1412.

== Geography ==
The municipality lies at an altitude of 116 metres (381 ft) and covers an area of 7.02 km^{2} (2.71 sq mi) (2025).

== Population ==
Population statistic (10 years)
Year	1995	2005	2015	2025
Count	219	195	206	205
Difference		−10.95%	+5.64%	−0.48%

Population statistic
Year	2024	2025
Count	197	205
Difference		+4.06%

It has a population of 205 people (31 December 2025).

=== Ethnicity ===
Census 2021 (1+ %)
Ethnicity	Number	Fraction
Slovak	165	85.93%
Not found out	18	9.37%
Ukrainian	8	4.16%
Romani	6	3.12%
Hungarian	5	2.6%
Czech	2	1.04%
Rusyn	2	1.04%
Total	192	

In year 2021 was 192 people by ethnicity 165 as Slovak, 18 as Not found out, 8 as Ukrainian, 6 as Romani, 5 as Hungarian, 2 as Czech and 2 as Rusyn.

Note on population: The difference values of population numbers in the table "Population statistic" and in the sections "Ethnicity" & "Religion" is caused by the use of various statistical methods.

=== Religion ===
Census 2021 (1+ %)
Religion	Number	Fraction
Roman Catholic Church	127	66.15%
Greek Catholic Church	35	18.23%
Not found out	17	8.85%
Eastern Orthodox Church	8	4.17%
None	4	2.08%
Total	192	

In year 2021 was 192 people by religion 127 from Roman Catholic Church, 35 from Greek Catholic Church, 17 from Not found out, 8 from Eastern Orthodox Church, 4 from None and 1 from Calvinist Church.

== Facilities ==
The village has a public library and a soccer pitch.
