= Jasenov, Sobrance District =

Jasenov Jeszenő
- Municipality
- Flag

- Location of Jasenov in the Košice Region Location of Jasenov in Slovakia
- Coordinates: 48.80°N 22.17°E
- Country: Slovakia
- Region: Košice Region
- District: Sobrance District
- First mentioned: 1279

Area
  - Total: 7.21 km^{2} (2.78 sq mi)
- Elevation: 170 m (560 ft)

Population (2025)
  - Total: 274
- Time zone: UTC+1 (CET)
  - Summer (DST): UTC+2 (CEST)
- Postal code: 724 2
- Area code: +421 56
- Vehicle registration plate (until 2022): SO
- Website: www.obecjasenov.sk

Jasenov (Hungarian: Jeszenő, Rusyn: Ясенів) is a village and municipality in the Sobrance District in the Košice Region of east Slovakia.

== History ==
In historical records the village was first mentioned in 1279. Before the establishment of independent Czechoslovakia in 1918, Jasenov was part of Ung County within the Kingdom of Hungary. In 1939, it was for a short time part of the Slovak Republic. As a result of the Slovak–Hungarian War of 1939, it was again part of Hungary from 1939 to 1944. In the autumn of 1944, the Red Army entered Jasenov and it was once again part of Czechoslovakia.

== Geography ==
The municipality lies at an altitude of 170 metres (560 ft) and covers an area of 7.21 km^{2} (2.78 sq mi) (2025).

== Population ==
Population statistic (10 years)
Year	1995	2005	2015	2025
Count	291	314	303	274
Difference		+7.90%	−3.50%	−9.57%

Population statistic
Year	2024	2025
Count	270	274
Difference		+1.48%

It has a population of 274 people (31 December 2025).

=== Ethnicity ===
Census 2021 (1+ %)
Ethnicity	Number	Fraction
Slovak	277	96.85%
Rusyn	11	3.84%
Not found out	6	2.09%
Ukrainian	3	1.04%
Total	286	

In year 2021 was 286 people by ethnicity 277 as Slovak, 11 as Rusyn, 6 as Not found out, 3 as Ukrainian, 1 as Czech, 1 as Polish, 1 as Hungarian and 1 as Other.

Note on population: The difference values of population numbers in the table "Population statistic" and in the sections "Ethnicity" & "Religion" is caused by the use of various statistical methods.

=== Religion ===
Census 2021 (1+ %)
Religion	Number	Fraction
Greek Catholic Church	167	58.39%
Roman Catholic Church	72	25.17%
None	28	9.79%
Not found out	9	3.15%
Eastern Orthodox Church	7	2.45%
Total	286	

In year 2021 was 286 people by religion 167 from Greek Catholic Church, 72 from Roman Catholic Church, 28 from None, 9 from Not found out, 7 from Eastern Orthodox Church, 1 from Calvinist Church, 1 from United Methodist Church and 1 from Evangelical Church.

== Facilities ==
The village has a public library, and a football pitch.

== See also ==
- List of municipalities and towns in Slovakia

== Genealogical resources ==
The records for genealogical research are available at the state archive "Statny Archiv in Presov, Slovakia"

- Greek Catholic church records (births/marriages/deaths): 1880–1919 (parish A)
