= Vyšná Rybnica =

Vyšná Rybnica Felsőhalas
- Municipality
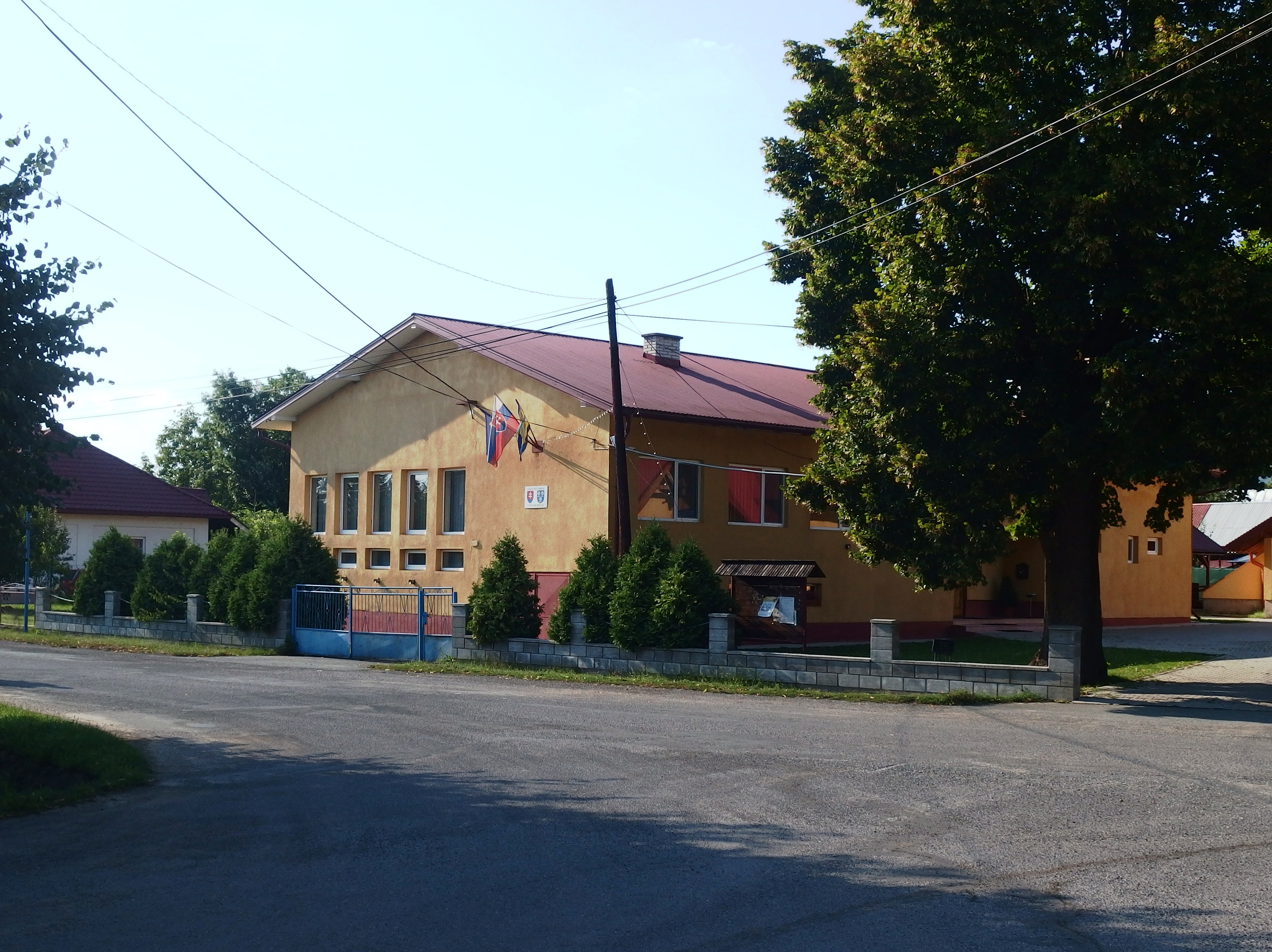

- Flag

- Location of Vyšná Rybnica in the Košice Region Location of Vyšná Rybnica in Slovakia
- Coordinates: 48.82°N 22.18°E
- Country: Slovakia
- Region: Košice Region
- District: Sobrance District
- First mentioned: 1419

Area
  - Total: 40.08 km^{2} (15.47 sq mi)
- Elevation: 219 m (719 ft)

Population (2025)
  - Total: 396
- Time zone: UTC+1 (CET)
  - Summer (DST): UTC+2 (CEST)
- Postal code: 724 1
- Area code: +421 56
- Vehicle registration plate (until 2022): SO
- Website: www.vysnarybnica.sk

Vyšná Rybnica (Hungarian: Felsőhalas, Rusyn: Вышня Рыбниця) is a village and municipality in the Sobrance District in the Košice Region of east Slovakia.

== History ==
In historical records the village was first mentioned in 1419.

== Geography ==
The municipality lies at an altitude of 219 metres (719 ft) and covers an area of 40.08 km^{2} (15.47 sq mi) (2025).

== Population ==
Population statistic (10 years)
Year	1995	2005	2015	2025
Count	381	388	364	396
Difference		+1.83%	−6.18%	+8.79%

Population statistic
Year	2024	2025
Count	396	396
Difference		+0%

It has a population of 396 people (31 December 2025).

=== Ethnicity ===
Census 2021 (1+ %)
Ethnicity	Number	Fraction
Slovak	359	92.28%
Not found out	29	7.45%
Rusyn	6	1.54%
Romani	5	1.28%
Total	389	

In year 2021 was 389 people by ethnicity 359 as Slovak, 29 as Not found out, 6 as Rusyn, 5 as Romani, 3 as Ukrainian and 1 as Hungarian.

Note on population: The difference values of population numbers in the table "Population statistic" and in the sections "Ethnicity" & "Religion" is caused by the use of various statistical methods.

=== Religion ===
Census 2021 (1+ %)
Religion	Number	Fraction
Greek Catholic Church	162	41.65%
Roman Catholic Church	155	39.85%
Not found out	28	7.2%
None	24	6.17%
Eastern Orthodox Church	14	3.6%
Total	389	

In year 2021 was 389 people by religion 162 from Greek Catholic Church, 155 from Roman Catholic Church, 28 from Not found out, 24 from None, 14 from Eastern Orthodox Church, 3 from Evangelical Church, 1 from Calvinist Church, 1 from Other and 1 from Church of the Brethren.

== Facilities ==
The village has a public library and a soccer pitch.
