= Porostov =

Porostov Porosztó
- Municipality
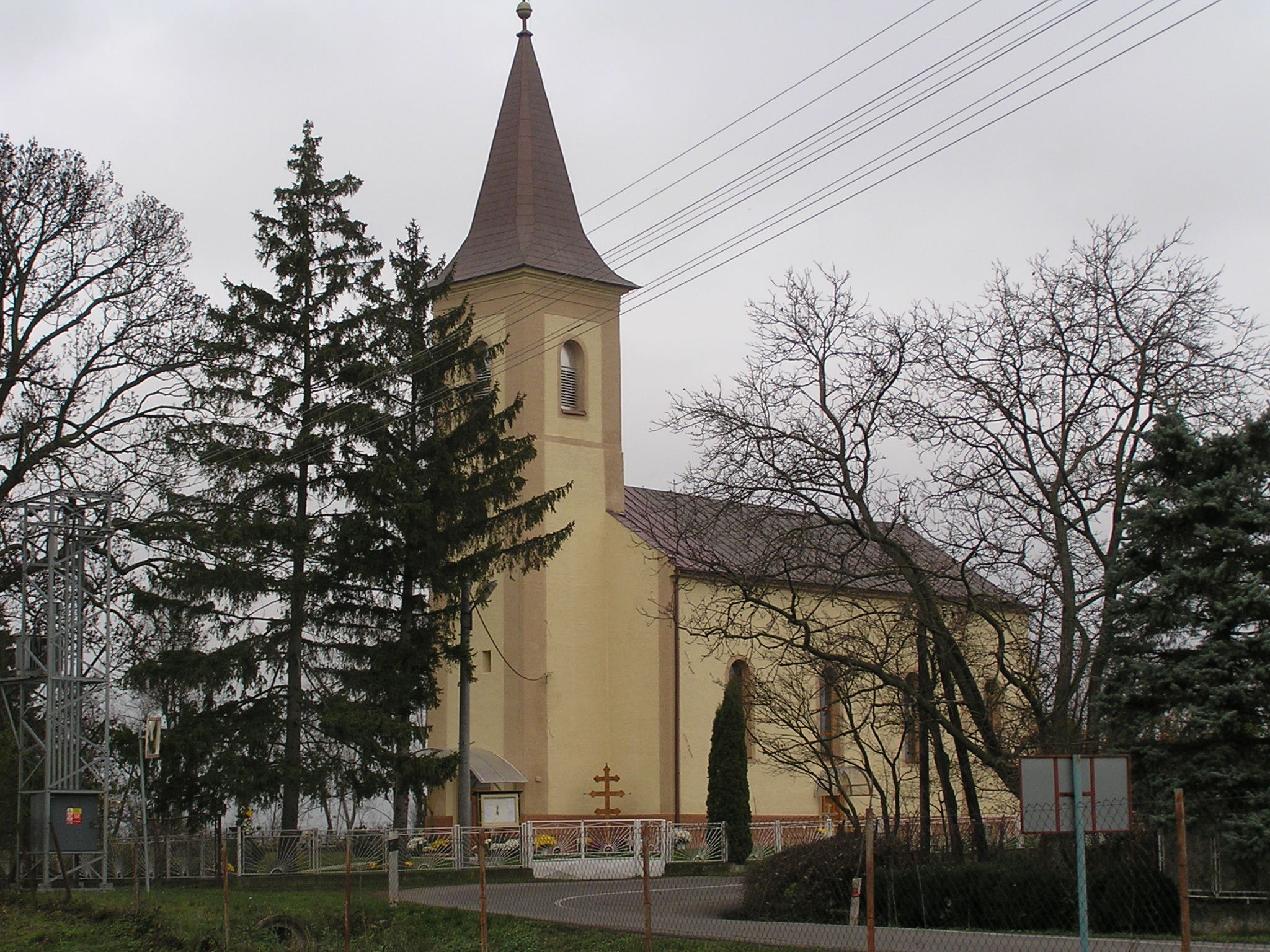
- Main church in Porostov

- Flag

- Location of Porostov in the Košice Region Location of Porostov in Slovakia
- Coordinates: 48.70°N 22.18°E
- Country: Slovakia
- Region: Košice Region
- District: Sobrance District
- First mentioned: 1412

Area
  - Total: 7.28 km^{2} (2.81 sq mi)
- Elevation: 109 m (358 ft)

Population (2025)
  - Total: 183
- Time zone: UTC+1 (CET)
  - Summer (DST): UTC+2 (CEST)
- Postal code: 725 5
- Area code: +421 56
- Vehicle registration plate (until 2022): SO
- Website: obecporostov.sk

Porostov (Hungarian: Porosztó) is a village and municipality in the Sobrance District in the Košice Region of east Slovakia.

== History ==
In historical records the village was first mentioned in 1412.

== Geography ==
The municipality lies at an altitude of 109 metres (358 ft) and covers an area of 7.28 km^{2} (2.81 sq mi) (2025).

== Population ==
Population statistic (10 years)
Year	1995	2005	2015	2025
Count	232	222	213	183
Difference		−4.31%	−4.05%	−14.08%

Population statistic
Year	2024	2025
Count	189	183
Difference		−3.17%

It has a population of 183 people (31 December 2025).

=== Ethnicity ===
Census 2021 (1+ %)
Ethnicity	Number	Fraction
Slovak	195	98.48%
Not found out	3	1.51%
Total	198	

In year 2021 was 198 people by ethnicity 195 as Slovak, 3 as Not found out and 1 as Czech.

Note on population: The difference values of population numbers in the table "Population statistic" and in the sections "Ethnicity" & "Religion" is caused by the use of various statistical methods.

=== Religion ===
Census 2021 (1+ %)
Religion	Number	Fraction
Greek Catholic Church	152	76.77%
Roman Catholic Church	23	11.62%
None	13	6.57%
Calvinist Church	4	2.02%
Not found out	3	1.52%
Evangelical Church	3	1.52%
Total	198	

In year 2021 was 198 people by religion 152 from Greek Catholic Church, 23 from Roman Catholic Church, 13 from None, 4 from Calvinist Church, 3 from Not found out and 3 from Evangelical Church.

== Culture ==
The village has a public library and a soccer pitch.
