= Husák (village) =

Village and municipality in Slovakia

Husák (village) Ungludas
- Municipality
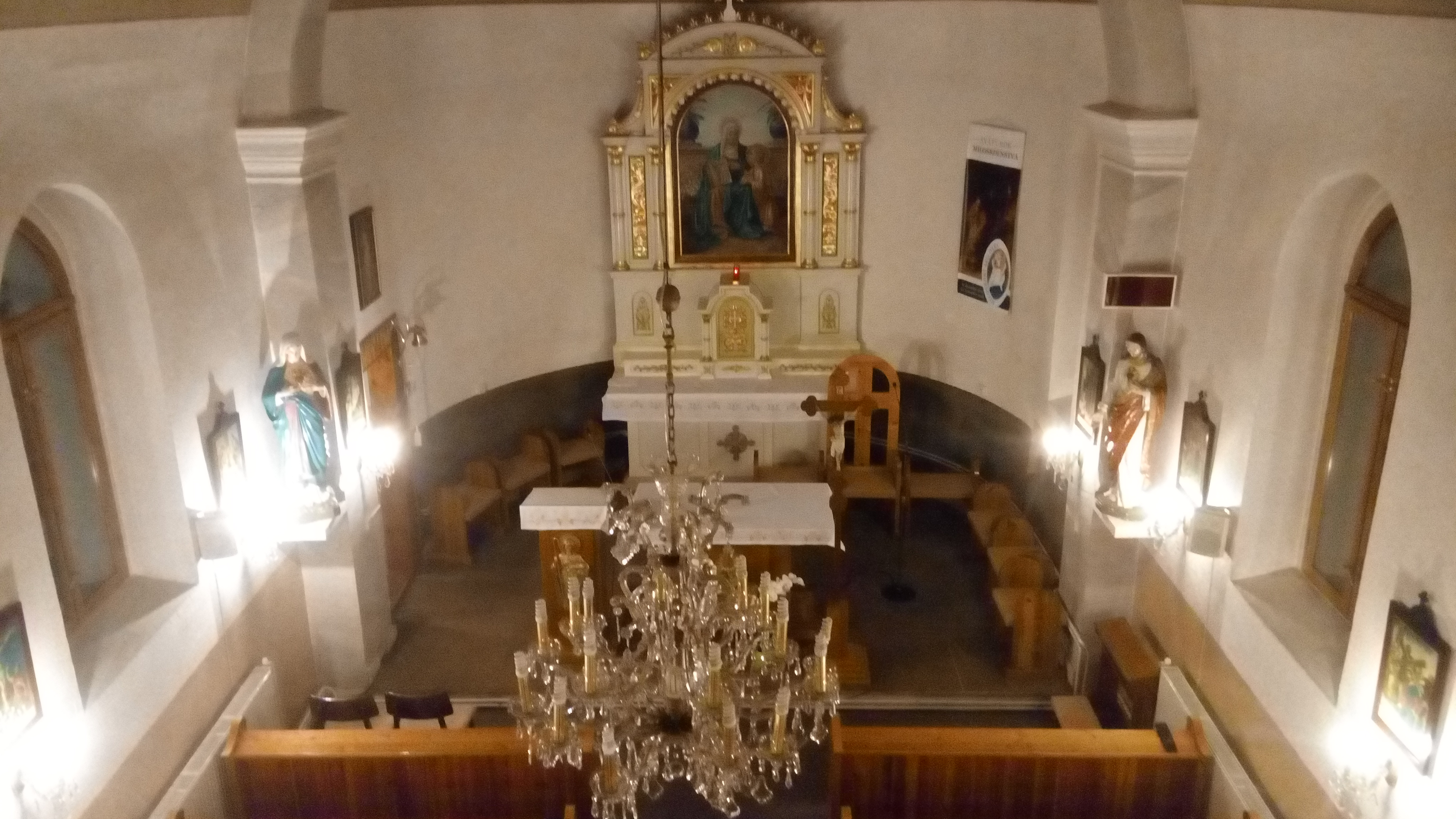

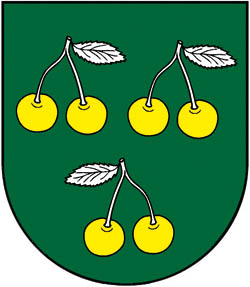
- Flag Coat of arms

- Location of Husák (village) in the Košice Region Location of Husák (village) in Slovakia
- Coordinates: 48.70°N 22.30°E
- Country: Slovakia
- Region: Košice Region
- District: Sobrance District
- First mentioned: 1567

Government
  - Mayor: Michal Copák (Ind.)

Area
  - Total: 14.80 km^{2} (5.71 sq mi)
- Elevation: 217 m (712 ft)

Population (2025)
  - Total: 159
- Time zone: UTC+1 (CET)
  - Summer (DST): UTC+2 (CEST)
- Postal code: 725 1
- Area code: +421 56
- Vehicle registration plate (until 2022): SO
- Website: www.husak.sk

Husák (Hungarian: Ungludas, Rusyn: Гусак) is a village and municipality in the Sobrance District in the Košice Region of east Slovakia.

== History ==
In historical records the village was first mentioned in 1567. Before the establishment of independent Czechoslovakia in 1918, Husák was part of Ung County within the Kingdom of Hungary. In 1939, it was for a short time part of the Slovak Republic. As a result of the Slovak–Hungarian War of 1939, it was again part of Hungary from 1939 to 1944. On 28 October 1944, the Red Army entered Husák and it was once again part of Czechoslovakia.

== Geography ==
The municipality lies at an altitude of 217 metres (712 ft) and covers an area of 14.80 km^{2} (5.71 sq mi) (2025).

== Population ==
Population statistic (10 years)
Year	1995	2005	2015	2025
Count	188	167	161	159
Difference		−11.17%	−3.59%	−1.24%

Population statistic
Year	2024	2025
Count	166	159
Difference		−4.21%

It has a population of 159 people (31 December 2025).

=== Ethnicity ===
Census 2021 (1+ %)
Ethnicity	Number	Fraction
Slovak	160	90.9%
Hungarian	7	3.97%
Other	7	3.97%
Ukrainian	6	3.4%
Not found out	4	2.27%
Total	176	

In year 2021 was 176 people by ethnicity 160 as Slovak, 7 as Hungarian, 7 as Other, 6 as Ukrainian, 4 as Not found out, 1 as Russian and 1 as Romanian.

Note on population: The difference values of population numbers in the table "Population statistic" and in the sections "Ethnicity" & "Religion" is caused by the use of various statistical methods.

=== Religion ===
Census 2021 (1+ %)
Religion	Number	Fraction
Roman Catholic Church	123	69.89%
Greek Catholic Church	29	16.48%
Calvinist Church	9	5.11%
None	7	3.98%
Eastern Orthodox Church	5	2.84%
Not found out	3	1.7%
Total	176	

In year 2021 was 176 people by religion 123 from Roman Catholic Church, 29 from Greek Catholic Church, 9 from Calvinist Church, 7 from None, 5 from Eastern Orthodox Church and 3 from Not found out.

== Culture ==
The village has a public library.

== Genealogical resources ==
The records for genealogical research are available at the state archive "Statny Archiv in Presov, Slovakia"

- Roman Catholic church records (births/marriages/deaths): 1789–1899 (parish B)
- Greek Catholic church records (births/marriages/deaths): 1834–1902 (parish B)

== See also ==
- List of municipalities and towns in Slovakia
