= Bunkovce =

Village and municipality in Slovakia

Bunkovce Bunkós
- Municipality
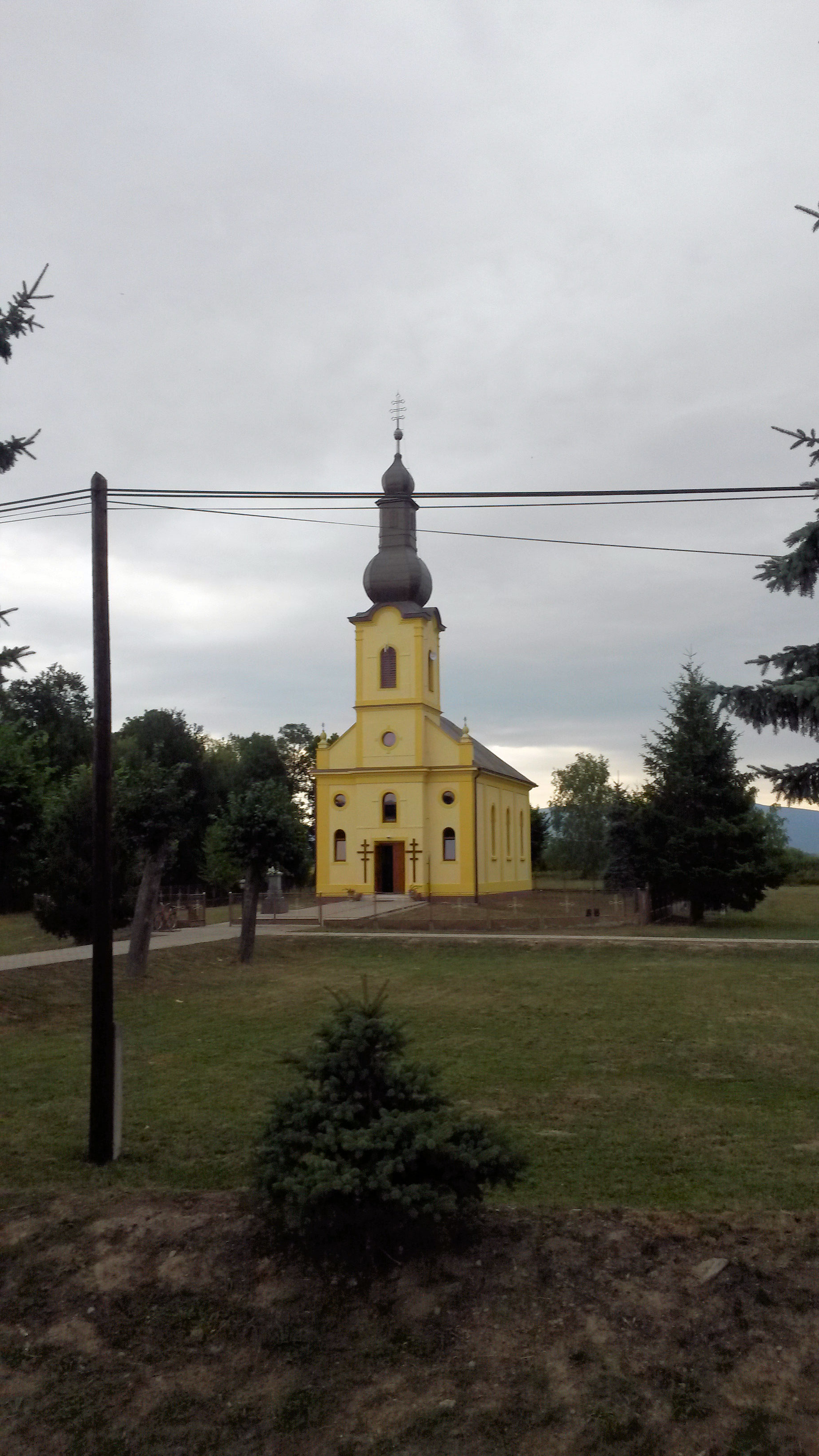

- Flag Coat of arms

- Location of Bunkovce in the Košice Region Location of Bunkovce in Slovakia
- Coordinates: 48.72°N 22.12°E
- Country: Slovakia
- Region: Košice Region
- District: Sobrance District
- First mentioned: 1358

Area
  - Total: 7.78 km^{2} (3.00 sq mi)
- Elevation: 106 m (348 ft)

Population (2025)
  - Total: 380
- Time zone: UTC+1 (CET)
  - Summer (DST): UTC+2 (CEST)
- Postal code: 724 4
- Area code: +421 56
- Vehicle registration plate (until 2022): SO
- Website: www.bunkovce.sk

Bunkovce (Hungarian: Bunkós, Rusyn: Бунківцї) is a village and municipality in the Sobrance District in the Košice Region of east Slovakia.

== History ==
In historical records, the village was first mentioned in 1358. Before the establishment of independent Czechoslovakia in 1918, Bunkovce was part of Ung County within the Kingdom of Hungary. In 1939, it was for a short time part of the Slovak Republic. As a result of the Slovak–Hungarian War of 1939, it was again part of Hungary from 1939 to 1944. In the autumn of 1944, the Red Army entered Bunkovce and it was once again part of Czechoslovakia.

== Geography ==
The municipality lies at an altitude of 106 metres (348 ft) and covers an area of 7.78 km^{2} (3.00 sq mi) (2025).

== Population ==
Population statistic (10 years)
Year	1995	2005	2015	2025
Count	270	336	378	380
Difference		+24.44%	+12.5%	+0.52%

Population statistic
Year	2024	2025
Count	384	380
Difference		−1.04%

It has a population of 380 people (31 December 2025).

=== Ethnicity ===
Census 2021 (1+ %)
Ethnicity	Number	Fraction
Slovak	350	89.28%
Not found out	30	7.65%
Romani	13	3.31%
Czech	6	1.53%
Ukrainian	5	1.27%
Total	392	

In year 2021 was 392 people by ethnicity 350 as Slovak, 30 as Not found out, 13 as Romani, 6 as Czech, 5 as Ukrainian, 3 as Rusyn, 2 as Hungarian, 2 as Other and 1 as Romanian.

Note on population: The difference values of population numbers in the table "Population statistic" and in the sections "Ethnicity" & "Religion" is caused by the use of various statistical methods.

=== Religion ===
Census 2021 (1+ %)
Religion	Number	Fraction
Greek Catholic Church	177	45.15%
Roman Catholic Church	103	26.28%
Not found out	42	10.71%
None	28	7.14%
Apostolic Church	14	3.57%
Evangelical Church	10	2.55%
Eastern Orthodox Church	9	2.3%
Church of the Brethren	6	1.53%
Total	392	

In year 2021 was 392 people by religion 177 from Greek Catholic Church, 103 from Roman Catholic Church, 42 from Not found out, 28 from None, 14 from Apostolic Church, 10 from Evangelical Church, 9 from Eastern Orthodox Church, 6 from Church of the Brethren, 2 from Jehovah's Witnesses and 1 from Ad hoc movements.

== Culture ==
The village has a soccer pitch.

== Genealogical resources ==
The records for genealogical research are available at the state archive "Statny Archiv in Presov, Slovakia"

- Greek Catholic church records (births/marriages/deaths): 1834–1895 (parish B)

== See also ==
- List of municipalities and towns in Slovakia
