= Koňuš =

Village and municipality in Slovakia

Koňuš Unglovasd
- Municipality
- Flag

- Location of Koňuš in the Košice Region Location of Koňuš in Slovakia
- Coordinates: 48.78°N 22.27°E
- Country: Slovakia
- Region: Košice Region
- District: Sobrance District
- First mentioned: 1414

Area
  - Total: 23.23 km^{2} (8.97 sq mi)
- Elevation: 270 m (890 ft)

Population (2025)
  - Total: 332
- Time zone: UTC+1 (CET)
  - Summer (DST): UTC+2 (CEST)
- Postal code: 726 3
- Area code: +421 56
- Vehicle registration plate (until 2022): SO
- Website: konus-obec.sk

Koňuš (Hungarian: Unglovasd) is a village and municipality in the Sobrance District in the Košice Region of east Slovakia.

== History ==
In historical records the village was first mentioned in 1414.

== Geography ==
The municipality lies at an altitude of 270 metres (890 ft) and covers an area of 23.23 km^{2} (8.97 sq mi) (2025).

== Population ==
Population statistic (10 years)
Year	1995	2005	2015	2025
Count	385	353	351	332
Difference		−8.31%	−0.56%	−5.41%

Population statistic
Year	2024	2025
Count	325	332
Difference		+2.15%

It has a population of 332 people (31 December 2025).

=== Ethnicity ===
Census 2021 (1+ %)
Ethnicity	Number	Fraction
Slovak	320	96.38%
Rusyn	11	3.31%
Ukrainian	5	1.5%
Total	332	

In year 2021 was 332 people by ethnicity 320 as Slovak, 11 as Rusyn, 5 as Ukrainian, 3 as Not found out, 2 as Czech, 2 as Polish, 1 as Jewish, 1 as Austrian, 1 as Hungarian, 1 as Other, 1 as Bulgarian and 1 as English.

Note on population: The difference values of population numbers in the table "Population statistic" and in the sections "Ethnicity" & "Religion" is caused by the use of various statistical methods.

=== Religion ===
Census 2021 (1+ %)
Religion	Number	Fraction
Greek Catholic Church	209	62.95%
Roman Catholic Church	64	19.28%
Eastern Orthodox Church	40	12.05%
None	12	3.61%
Total	332	

In year 2021 was 332 people by religion 209 from Greek Catholic Church, 64 from Roman Catholic Church, 40 from Eastern Orthodox Church, 12 from None, 3 from Not found out, 2 from Other and not ascertained christian church, 1 from Other and 1 from Baptists Church.

== Culture ==
The village has a public library, a gym and a football pitch.

== Genealogical resources ==
The records for genealogical research are available at the state archive "Statny Archiv in Presov, Slovakia"

- Roman Catholic church records (births/marriages/deaths): 1837–1931 (parish B)
- Greek Catholic church records (births/marriages/deaths): 1792–1903 (parish B)

== See also ==
- List of municipalities and towns in Slovakia
