= Ostrov, Sobrance District =

Ostrov Éles
- Municipality
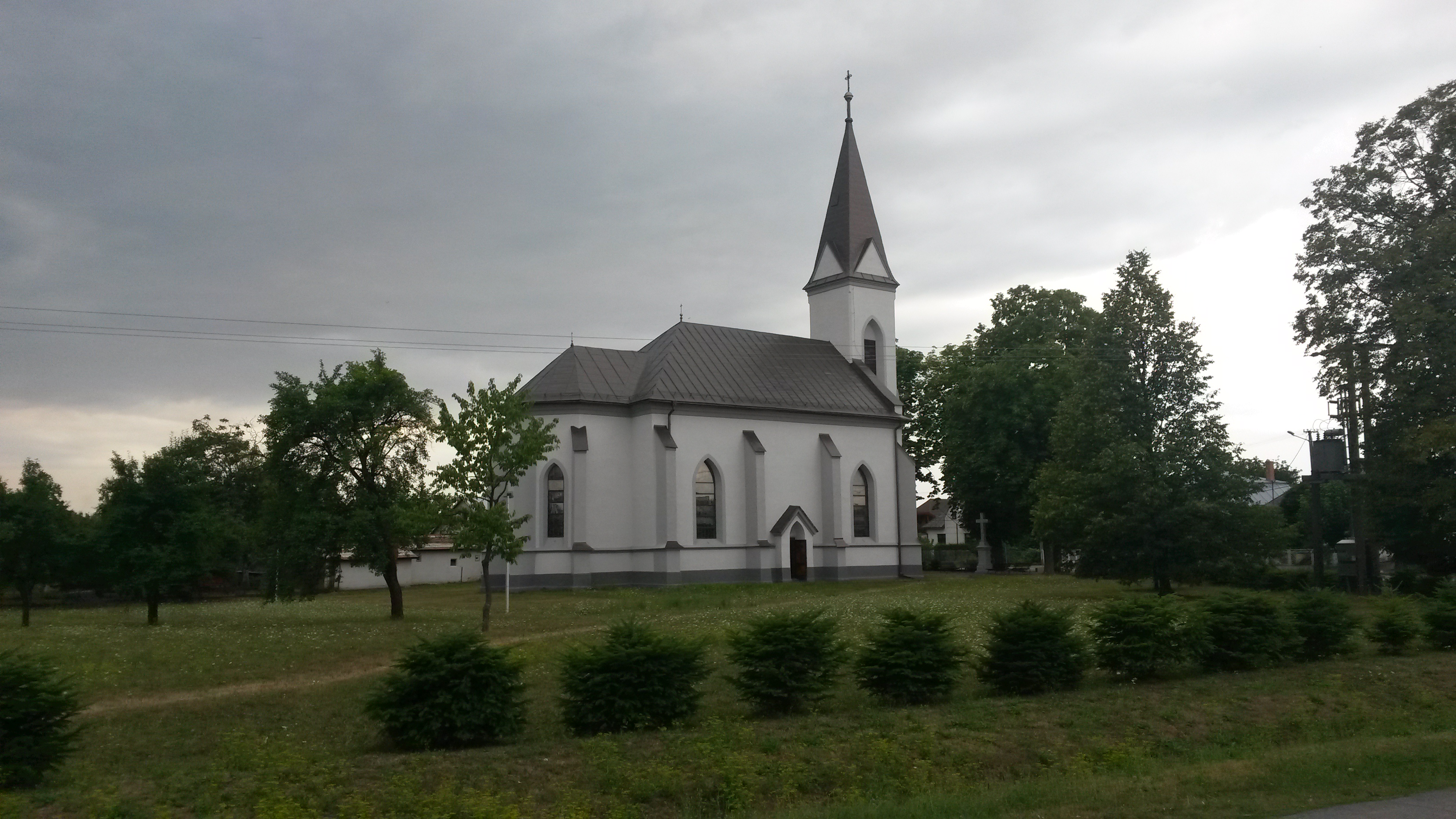

- Flag

- Location of Ostrov in the Košice Region Location of Ostrov in Slovakia
- Coordinates: 48.72°N 22.16°E
- Country: Slovakia
- Region: Košice Region
- District: Sobrance District
- First mentioned: 1336

Area
  - Total: 11.11 km^{2} (4.29 sq mi)
- Elevation: 108 m (354 ft)

Population (2025)
  - Total: 306
- Time zone: UTC+1 (CET)
  - Summer (DST): UTC+2 (CEST)
- Postal code: 725 5
- Area code: +421 56
- Vehicle registration plate (until 2022): SO
- Website: www.ostrov-obec.sk

Ostrov (Hungarian: Éles) is a village and municipality in the Sobrance District in the Košice Region of eastern Slovakia.

== Population ==
Population statistic (10 years)
Year	1995	2005	2015	2025
Count	286	267	299	306
Difference		−6.64%	+11.98%	+2.34%

Population statistic
Year	2024	2025
Count	306	306
Difference		+0%

It has a population of 306 people (31 December 2025).

=== Ethnicity ===
Census 2021 (1+ %)
Ethnicity	Number	Fraction
Slovak	305	92.42%
Not found out	13	3.93%
Ukrainian	6	1.81%
Romani	4	1.21%
Total	330	

In year 2021 was 330 people by ethnicity 305 as Slovak, 13 as Not found out, 6 as Ukrainian, 4 as Romani, 2 as Czech, 1 as Rusyn and 1 as Hungarian.

Note on population: The difference values of population numbers in the table "Population statistic" and in the sections "Ethnicity" & "Religion" is caused by the use of various statistical methods.

=== Religion ===
Census 2021 (1+ %)
Religion	Number	Fraction
Roman Catholic Church	203	61.52%
Greek Catholic Church	66	20%
Not found out	25	7.58%
None	25	7.58%
Eastern Orthodox Church	10	3.03%
Total	330	

In year 2021 was 330 people by religion 203 from Roman Catholic Church, 66 from Greek Catholic Church, 25 from Not found out, 25 from None, 10 from Eastern Orthodox Church and 1 from Calvinist Church.
