= Nižné Nemecké =

Nižné Nemecké Alsónémeti
- Municipality
- Flag

- Location of Nižné Nemecké in the Košice Region Location of Nižné Nemecké in Slovakia
- Coordinates: 48.65°N 22.25°E
- Country: Slovakia
- Region: Košice Region
- District: Sobrance District
- First mentioned: 1353

Government
  - Mayor: Milan Husár (SNS)

Area
  - Total: 7.25 km^{2} (2.80 sq mi)
- Elevation: 115 m (377 ft)

Population (2025)
  - Total: 307
- Time zone: UTC+1 (CET)
  - Summer (DST): UTC+2 (CEST)
- Postal code: 725 2
- Area code: +421 56
- Vehicle registration plate (until 2022): SO
- Website: www.niznenemecke.sk

Nižné Nemecké (Hungarian: Alsónémeti) is a village and municipality in the Sobrance District in the Košice Region of east Slovakia. The name of the village literally means "Germans of the lower" e.g. German women/things living/positioned in a lower area/village, where Germans is an adjective in the feminine or neuter gender.

== History ==
In historical records the village was first mentioned in 1353. During the Slovak-Hungarian War this village was a target of shelling and bombing by Hungarian forces.

== Geography ==
The municipality lies at an altitude of 115 metres (377 ft) and covers an area of 7.25 km^{2} (2.80 sq mi) (2025).

== Population ==
Population statistic (10 years)
Year	1995	2005	2015	2025
Count	334	333	335	307
Difference		−0.29%	+0.60%	−8.35%

Population statistic
Year	2024	2025
Count	308	307
Difference		−0.32%

It has a population of 307 people (31 December 2025).

=== Ethnicity ===
Census 2021 (1+ %)
Ethnicity	Number	Fraction
Slovak	313	95.13%
Not found out	10	3.03%
Czech	7	2.12%
Rusyn	7	2.12%
Total	329	

In year 2021 was 329 people by ethnicity 313 as Slovak, 10 as Not found out, 7 as Czech, 7 as Rusyn, 3 as Other, 1 as Ukrainian and 1 as Hungarian.

Note on population: The difference values of population numbers in the table "Population statistic" and in the sections "Ethnicity" & "Religion" is caused by the use of various statistical methods.

=== Religion ===
Census 2021 (1+ %)
Religion	Number	Fraction
Roman Catholic Church	222	67.48%
Greek Catholic Church	62	18.84%
Calvinist Church	14	4.26%
None	14	4.26%
Not found out	10	3.04%
Eastern Orthodox Church	5	1.52%
Total	329	

In year 2021 was 329 people by religion 222 from Roman Catholic Church, 62 from Greek Catholic Church, 14 from Calvinist Church, 14 from None, 10 from Not found out, 5 from Eastern Orthodox Church, 1 from Christian Congregations in Slovakia and 1 from Evangelical Church.

== Culture ==
The village has a library and a soccer pitch.
