= Nižná Rybnica =

Village and municipality in Slovakia

Nižná Rybnica Alsóhalas
- Municipality
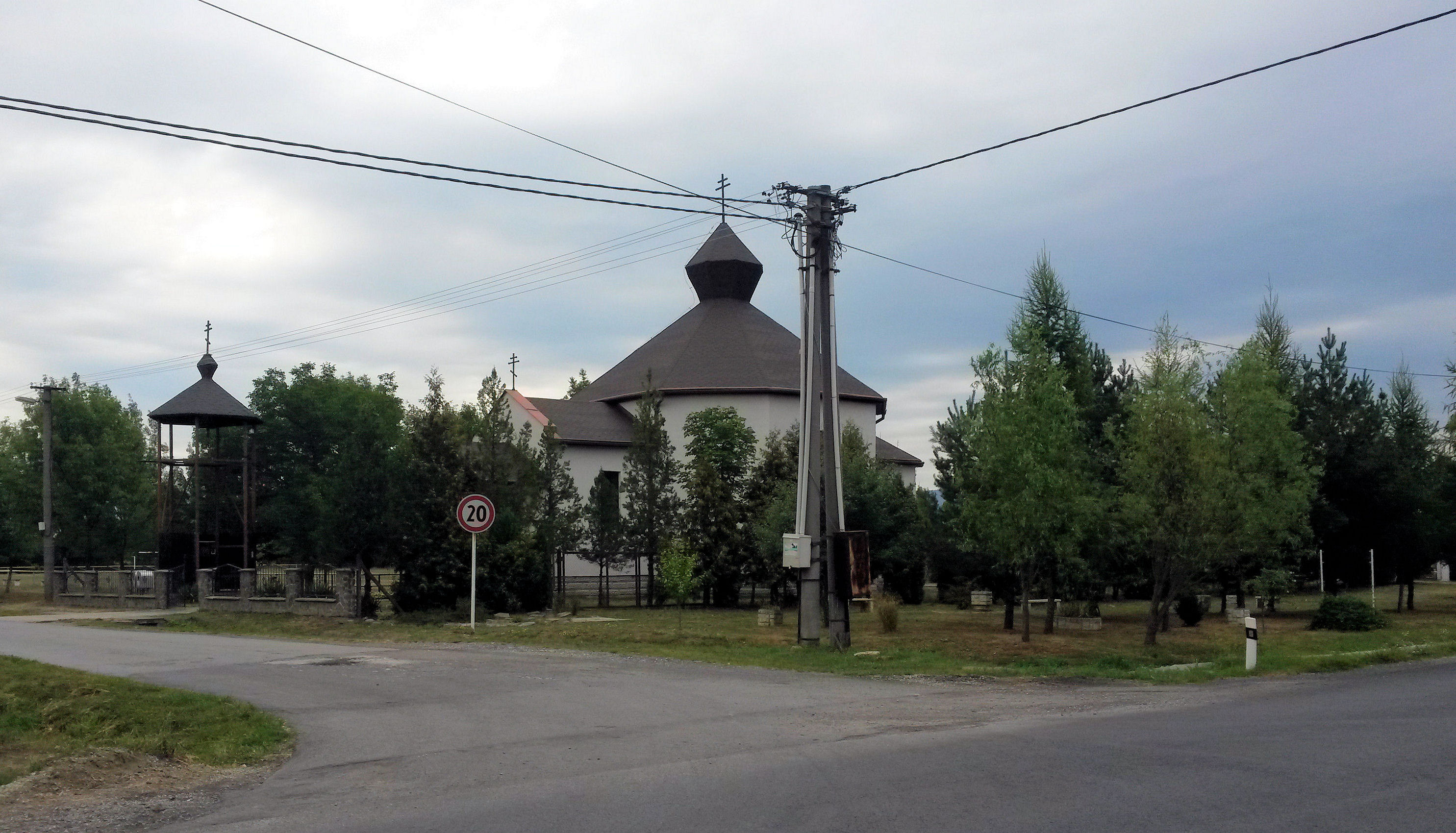

- Flag

- Location of Nižná Rybnica in the Košice Region Location of Nižná Rybnica in Slovakia
- Coordinates: 48.75°N 22.15°E
- Country: Slovakia
- Region: Košice Region
- District: Sobrance District
- First mentioned: 1333

Area
  - Total: 8.99 km^{2} (3.47 sq mi)
- Elevation: 118 m (387 ft)

Population (2025)
  - Total: 416
- Time zone: UTC+1 (CET)
  - Summer (DST): UTC+2 (CEST)
- Postal code: 730 1
- Area code: +421 56
- Vehicle registration plate (until 2022): SO
- Website: www.niznarybnica.sk

Nižná Rybnica (Hungarian: Alsóhalas) is a small village and municipality in the Sobrance District in the Košice Region of east Slovakia.

== History ==
In historical records the village was first mentioned in 1333.

== Geography ==
The municipality lies at an altitude of 118 metres (387 ft) and covers an area of 8.99 km^{2} (3.47 sq mi) (2025).

== Population ==
Population statistic (10 years)
Year	1995	2005	2015	2025
Count	350	406	410	416
Difference		+16%	+0.98%	+1.46%

Population statistic
Year	2024	2025
Count	419	416
Difference		−0.71%

It has a population of 416 people (31 December 2025).

=== Ethnicity ===
Census 2021 (1+ %)
Ethnicity	Number	Fraction
Slovak	384	93.65%
Not found out	22	5.36%
Rusyn	10	2.43%
Total	410	

In year 2021 was 410 people by ethnicity 384 as Slovak, 22 as Not found out, 10 as Rusyn, 3 as Ukrainian, 1 as Italian and 1 as Hungarian.

Note on population: The difference values of population numbers in the table "Population statistic" and in the sections "Ethnicity" & "Religion" is caused by the use of various statistical methods.

=== Religion ===
Census 2021 (1+ %)
Religion	Number	Fraction
Greek Catholic Church	147	35.85%
Roman Catholic Church	95	23.17%
None	81	19.76%
Eastern Orthodox Church	65	15.85%
Not found out	17	4.15%
Total	410	

In year 2021 was 410 people by religion 147 from Greek Catholic Church, 95 from Roman Catholic Church, 81 from None, 65 from Eastern Orthodox Church, 17 from Not found out, 3 from Calvinist Church, 1 from Other and not ascertained christian church and 1 from Buddhism.

== Culture ==
The village has a public library.
