= Pinkovce =

Pinkovce Ungpinkóc
- Municipality
- Flag

- Location of Pinkovce in the Košice Region Location of Pinkovce in Slovakia
- Coordinates: 48.60°N 22.18°E
- Country: Slovakia
- Region: Košice Region
- District: Sobrance District
- First mentioned: 1343

Area
  - Total: 3.31 km^{2} (1.28 sq mi)
- Elevation: 108 m (354 ft)

Population (2025)
  - Total: 174
- Time zone: UTC+1 (CET)
  - Summer (DST): UTC+2 (CEST)
- Postal code: 725 4
- Area code: +421 56
- Vehicle registration plate (until 2022): SO
- Website: www.pinkovce.sk

Pinkovce (Hungarian: Ungpinkóc) is a small village and municipality in the Sobrance District in the Košice Region of east Slovakia.

== History ==
In historical records the village was first mentioned in 1343.

== Geography ==
The municipality lies at an altitude of 108 metres (354 ft) and covers an area of 3.31 km^{2} (1.28 sq mi) (2025).

Pinkovce sits on the west bank of the Uzh River at the point where the river forms the international boundary between Slovakia and Ukraine.

== Population ==
Population statistic (10 years)
Year	1995	2005	2015	2025
Count	211	186	172	174
Difference		−11.84%	−7.52%	+1.16%

Population statistic
Year	2024	2025
Count	187	174
Difference		−6.95%

It has a population of 174 people (31 December 2025).

=== Ethnicity ===
Census 2021 (1+ %)
Ethnicity	Number	Fraction
Slovak	174	96.66%
Not found out	5	2.77%
Czech	4	2.22%
Romani	2	1.11%
Total	180	

In year 2021 was 180 people by ethnicity 174 as Slovak, 5 as Not found out, 4 as Czech, 2 as Romani, 1 as Rusyn, 1 as Hungarian and 1 as Other.

Note on population: The difference values of population numbers in the table "Population statistic" and in the sections "Ethnicity" & "Religion" is caused by the use of various statistical methods.

=== Religion ===
Census 2021 (1+ %)
Religion	Number	Fraction
Calvinist Church	51	28.33%
Roman Catholic Church	50	27.78%
Greek Catholic Church	45	25%
None	12	6.67%
Jehovah's Witnesses	10	5.56%
Eastern Orthodox Church	6	3.33%
Not found out	2	1.11%
Evangelical Church	2	1.11%
Total	180	

In year 2021 was 180 people by religion 51 from Calvinist Church, 50 from Roman Catholic Church, 45 from Greek Catholic Church, 12 from None, 10 from Jehovah's Witnesses, 6 from Eastern Orthodox Church, 2 from Not found out, 2 from Evangelical Church, 1 from Christian Congregations in Slovakia and 1 from Buddhism.

== Culture ==
The village has a public library.
