= Kolibabovce =

Municipality of Slovakia

Kolibabovce Bölcsős
- Municipality
- Flag

- Location of Kolibabovce in the Košice Region Location of Kolibabovce in Slovakia
- Coordinates: 48.72°N 22.27°E
- Country: Slovakia
- Region: Košice Region
- District: Sobrance District
- First mentioned: 1567

Area
  - Total: 3.82 km^{2} (1.47 sq mi)
- Elevation: 174 m (571 ft)

Population (2025)
  - Total: 198
- Time zone: UTC+1 (CET)
  - Summer (DST): UTC+2 (CEST)
- Postal code: 726 1
- Area code: +421 56
- Vehicle registration plate (until 2022): SO
- Website: www.kolibabovce.sk

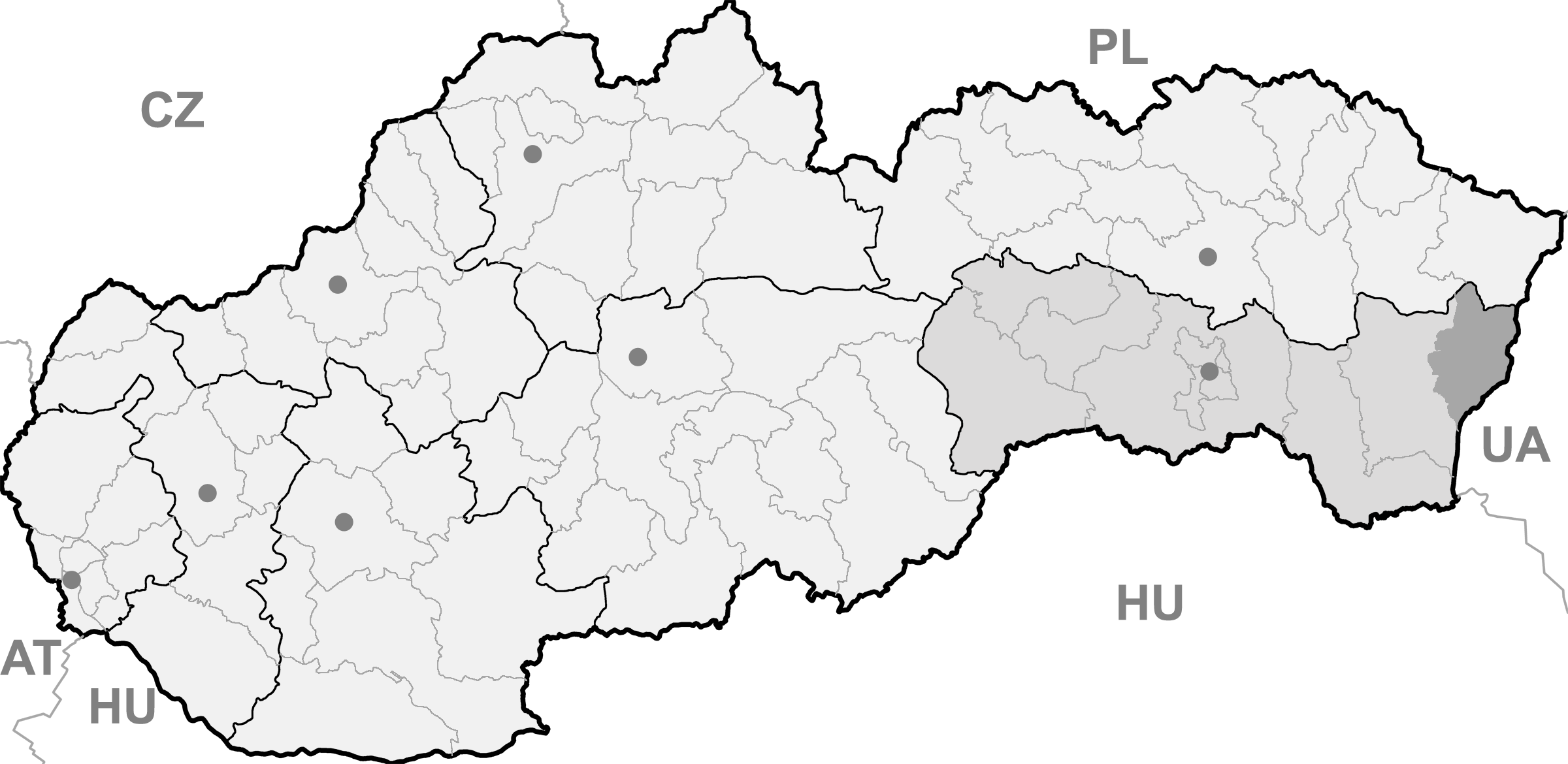
Map of Slovakia, Sobrance district and Kosice region highlighted.

Kolibabovce (Hungarian: Bölcsős) is a village and municipality in the Sobrance District in the Košice Region of east Slovakia.

== History ==
In historical records the village was first mentioned in 1567.

== Geography ==
The municipality lies at an altitude of 174 metres (571 ft) and covers an area of 3.82 km^{2} (1.47 sq mi) (2025).

== Population ==
Population statistic (10 years)
| Year | 1995 | 2005 | 2015 | 2025 |
|---|---|---|---|---|
| Count | 165 | 191 | 200 | 198 |
| Difference | | +15.75% | +4.71% | −1% |

Population statistic
| Year | 2024 | 2025 |
|---|---|---|
| Count | 199 | 198 |
| Difference | | −0.50% |

It has a population of 198 people (31 December 2025).

=== Ethnicity ===
Census 2021 (1+ %)
| Ethnicity | Number | Fraction |
|---|---|---|
| Slovak | 162 | 89.01% |
| Romani | 20 | 10.98% |
| Ukrainian | 13 | 7.14% |
| Hungarian | 7 | 3.84% |
| Not found out | 6 | 3.29% |
| Rusyn | 2 | 1.09% |
| Total | 182 | |

In year 2021 was 182 people by ethnicity 162 as Slovak, 20 as Romani, 13 as Ukrainian, 7 as Hungarian, 6 as Not found out, 2 as Rusyn, 1 as Czech and 1 as Russian.

Note on population: The difference values of population numbers in the table "Population statistic" and in the sections "Ethnicity" & "Religion" is caused by the use of various statistical methods.

=== Religion ===
Census 2021 (1+ %)
| Religion | Number | Fraction |
|---|---|---|
| Greek Catholic Church | 126 | 69.23% |
| Roman Catholic Church | 26 | 14.29% |
| Eastern Orthodox Church | 10 | 5.49% |
| Other and not ascertained christian church | 7 | 3.85% |
| Not found out | 6 | 3.3% |
| None | 6 | 3.3% |
| Total | 182 | |

In year 2021 was 182 people by religion 126 from Greek Catholic Church, 26 from Roman Catholic Church, 10 from Eastern Orthodox Church, 7 from Other and not ascertained christian church, 6 from Not found out, 6 from None and 1 from Calvinist Church.

== Culture ==
The village has a football pitch.

== Genealogical resources ==
The records for genealogical research are available at the state archive "Statny Archiv in Presov, Slovakia"

- Roman Catholic church records (births/marriages/deaths): 1837–1931 (parish B)
- Greek Catholic church records (births/marriages/deaths): 1834–1902 (parish B)

== See also ==
- List of municipalities and towns in Slovakia
