= Petrovce, Sobrance District =

Petrovce Ungpéteri
- Municipality
- Flag

- Location of Petrovce in the Košice Region Location of Petrovce in Slovakia
- Coordinates: 48.71°N 22.32°E
- Country: Slovakia
- Region: Košice Region
- District: Sobrance District
- First mentioned: 1571

Area
  - Total: 16.46 km^{2} (6.36 sq mi)
- Elevation: 279 m (915 ft)

Population (2025)
  - Total: 210
- Time zone: UTC+1 (CET)
  - Summer (DST): UTC+2 (CEST)
- Postal code: 726 2
- Area code: +421 56
- Vehicle registration plate (until 2022): SO
- Website: www.petrovcehuta.sk

Petrovce (Hungarian: Ungpéteri) is a village and municipality in the Sobrance District in the Košice Region of east Slovakia.

== History ==
In historical records the village was first mentioned in 1571.

== Geography ==
The municipality lies at an altitude of 279 metres (915 ft) and covers an area of 16.46 km^{2} (6.36 sq mi) (2025).

== Population ==
Population statistic (10 years)
Year	1995	2005	2015	2025
Count	295	234	210	210
Difference		−20.67%	−10.25%	+0%

Population statistic
Year	2024	2025
Count	211	210
Difference		−0.47%

It has a population of 210 people (31 December 2025).

=== Ethnicity ===
Census 2021 (1+ %)
Ethnicity	Number	Fraction
Slovak	196	97.51%
Total	201	

In year 2021 was 201 people by ethnicity 196 as Slovak, 2 as Ukrainian, 2 as Not found out, 1 as Czech, 1 as Russian, 1 as German and 1 as Hungarian.

Note on population: The difference values of population numbers in the table "Population statistic" and in the sections "Ethnicity" & "Religion" is caused by the use of various statistical methods.

=== Religion ===
Census 2021 (1+ %)
Religion	Number	Fraction
Roman Catholic Church	111	55.22%
Greek Catholic Church	67	33.33%
None	14	6.97%
Not found out	6	2.99%
Eastern Orthodox Church	2	1%
Total	201	

In year 2021 was 201 people by religion 111 from Roman Catholic Church, 67 from Greek Catholic Church, 14 from None, 6 from Not found out, 2 from Eastern Orthodox Church and 1 from Calvinist Church.

== Culture ==
The village has a public library.
