= Baškovce, Sobrance District =

Baškovce Alsóbaskóc
- Municipality
- Flag

- Location of Baškovce in the Košice Region Location of Baškovce in Slovakia
- Coordinates: 48.78°N 22.20°E
- Country: Slovakia
- Region: Košice Region
- District: Sobrance District
- First mentioned: 1427

Government
  - Mayor: Viera Lukáčová

Area
  - Total: 6.21 km^{2} (2.40 sq mi)
- Elevation: 172 m (564 ft)

Population (2025)
  - Total: 212
- Time zone: UTC+1 (CET)
  - Summer (DST): UTC+2 (CEST)
- Postal code: 730 1
- Area code: +421 56
- Vehicle registration plate (until 2022): SO
- Website: www.baskovce.sk

Baškovce (Hungarian: Alsóbaskóc; Rusyn: Башківцї) is a village and municipality in the Sobrance District in the Košice Region of east Slovakia.

== History ==
Before the establishment of independent Czechoslovakia in 1918, Baškovce was part of Ung County within the Kingdom of Hungary. In 1939, it was for a short time part of the Slovak Republic. As a result of the Slovak–Hungarian War of 1939, it was again part of Hungary from 1939 to 1944. In the autumn of 1944, the Red Army entered Baškovce and it was once again part of Czechoslovakia.

== Population ==
Population statistic (10 years)
Year	1995	2005	2015	2025
Count	264	257	248	212
Difference		−2.65%	−3.50%	−14.51%

Population statistic
Year	2024	2025
Count	215	212
Difference		−1.39%

It has a population of 212 people (31 December 2025).

=== Ethnicity ===
Census 2021 (1+ %)
Ethnicity	Number	Fraction
Slovak	224	96.55%
Not found out	7	3.01%
Rusyn	3	1.29%
Other	3	1.29%
Total	232	

In year 2021 was 232 people by ethnicity 224 as Slovak, 7 as Not found out, 3 as Rusyn, 3 as Other, 2 as Polish and 1 as Hungarian.

Note on population: The difference values of population numbers in the table "Population statistic" and in the sections "Ethnicity" & "Religion" is caused by the use of various statistical methods.

=== Religion ===
Census 2021 (1+ %)
Religion	Number	Fraction
Greek Catholic Church	133	57.33%
Roman Catholic Church	80	34.48%
None	11	4.74%
Not found out	6	2.59%
Total	232	

In year 2021 was 232 people by religion 133 from Greek Catholic Church, 80 from Roman Catholic Church, 11 from None, 6 from Not found out, 1 from Calvinist Church and 1 from Other.

== Genealogical resources ==
The records for genealogical research are available at the state archive in Prešov (Slovak: Štátny archív v Prešove).

- Roman Catholic church records (births/marriages/deaths): 1834-1916 (parish B)

== See also ==
- List of municipalities and towns in Slovakia
