= Blatná Polianka =

Village and municipality in Slovakia

Blatná Polianka Sárosmező
- Municipality
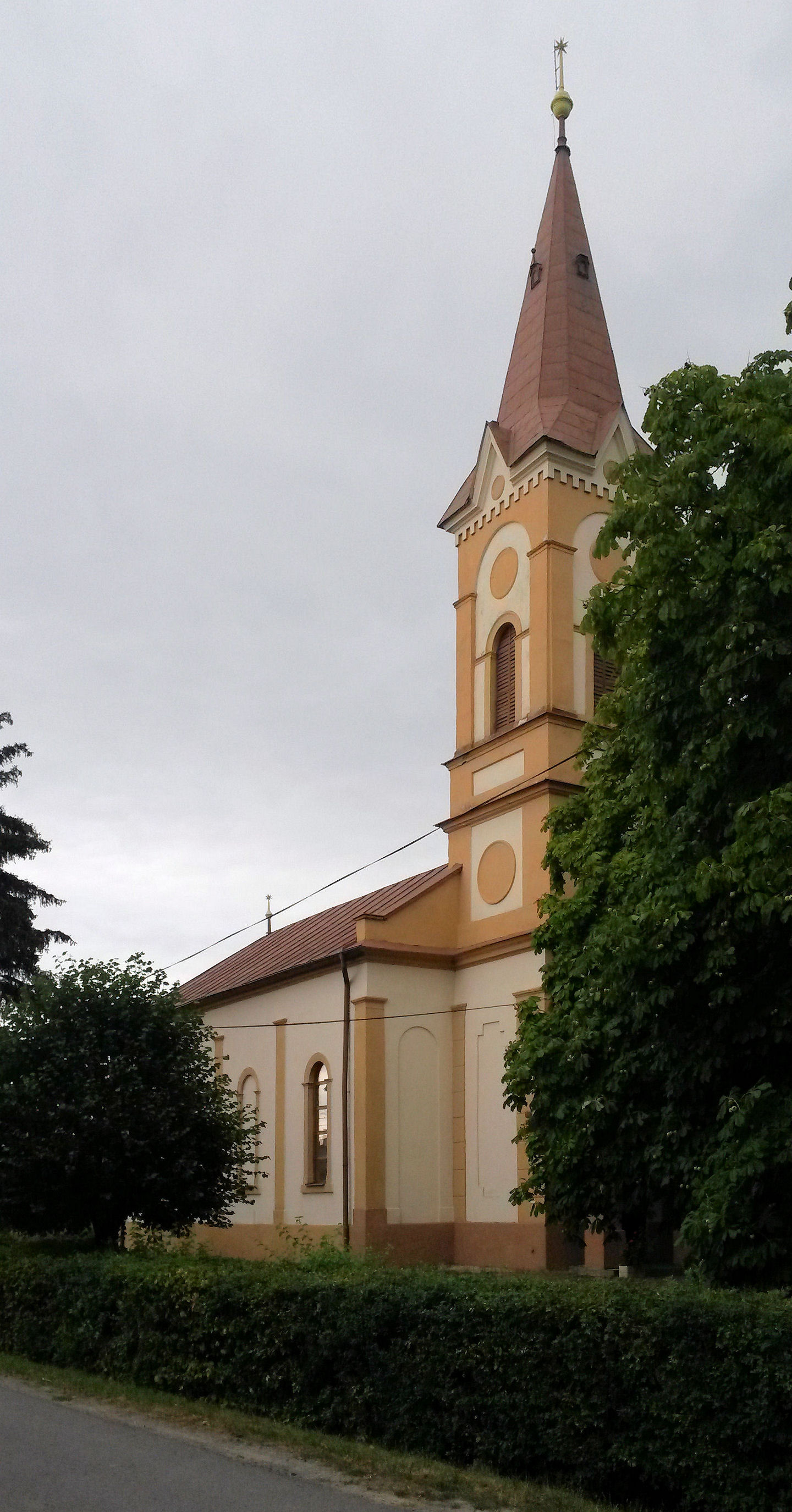

- Flag

- Location of Blatná Polianka in the Košice Region Location of Blatná Polianka in Slovakia
- Coordinates: 48.68°N 22.10°E
- Country: Slovakia
- Region: Košice Region
- District: Sobrance District
- First mentioned: 1417

Area
  - Total: 9.98 km^{2} (3.85 sq mi)
- Elevation: 102 m (335 ft)

Population (2025)
  - Total: 172
- Time zone: UTC+1 (CET)
  - Summer (DST): UTC+2 (CEST)
- Postal code: 724 4
- Area code: +421 56
- Vehicle registration plate (until 2022): SO
- Website: blatnapolianka.sk

Blatná Polianka (Hungarian: Sárosmező, Rusyn: Блатна Полянка) is a village and municipality in the Sobrance District in the Košice Region of east Slovakia.

== History ==
In historical records the village was first mentioned in 1417. Before the establishment of independent Czechoslovakia in 1918, Blatná Polianka was part of Ung County within the Kingdom of Hungary. In 1939, it was for a short time part of the Slovak Republic. As a result of the Slovak–Hungarian War of 1939, it was again part of Hungary from 1939 to 1944. In the autumn of 1944, the Red Army entered Blatná Polianka and it was once again part of Czechoslovakia.

== Geography ==
The municipality lies at an altitude of 102 metres (335 ft) and covers an area of 9.98 km^{2} (3.85 sq mi) (2025).

== Population ==
Population statistic (10 years)
Year	1995	2005	2015	2025
Count	194	157	161	172
Difference		−19.07%	+2.54%	+6.83%

Population statistic
Year	2024	2025
Count	172	172
Difference		+0%

It has a population of 172 people (31 December 2025).

=== Ethnicity ===
Census 2021 (1+ %)
Ethnicity	Number	Fraction
Slovak	155	93.37%
Not found out	9	5.42%
Romani	5	3.01%
Total	166	

In year 2021 was 166 people by ethnicity 155 as Slovak, 9 as Not found out and 5 as Romani.

Note on population: The difference values of population numbers in the table "Population statistic" and in the sections "Ethnicity" & "Religion" is caused by the use of various statistical methods.

=== Religion ===
Census 2021 (1+ %)
Religion	Number	Fraction
Calvinist Church	77	46.39%
None	32	19.28%
Greek Catholic Church	20	12.05%
Roman Catholic Church	12	7.23%
Evangelical Church	11	6.63%
Not found out	7	4.22%
Christian Congregations in Slovakia	4	2.41%
Ad hoc movements	2	1.2%
Total	166	

In year 2021 was 166 people by religion 77 from Calvinist Church, 32 from None, 20 from Greek Catholic Church, 12 from Roman Catholic Church, 11 from Evangelical Church, 7 from Not found out, 4 from Christian Congregations in Slovakia, 2 from Ad hoc movements and 1 from Eastern Orthodox Church.

== Culture ==
The village has a public library and a football pitch

== Genealogical resources ==
The records for genealogical research are available at the state archive "Statny Archiv in Presov, Slovakia"

- Greek Catholic church records (births/marriages/deaths): 1834–1895 (parish B)
- Reformated church records (births/marriages/deaths): 1797–1916 (parish B)

== See also ==
- List of municipalities and towns in Slovakia
