= Choňkovce =

Village and municipality in Slovakia

Choňkovce Alsóhunkóc
- Municipality
- Flag

- Location of Choňkovce in the Košice Region Location of Choňkovce in Slovakia
- Coordinates: 48.78°N 22.25°E
- Country: Slovakia
- Region: Košice Region
- District: Sobrance District
- First mentioned: 1409

Area
  - Total: 18.31 km^{2} (7.07 sq mi)
- Elevation: 200 m (660 ft)

Population (2025)
  - Total: 508
- Time zone: UTC+1 (CET)
  - Summer (DST): UTC+2 (CEST)
- Postal code: 726 3
- Area code: +421 56
- Vehicle registration plate (until 2022): SO
- Website: www.chonkovce-obec.sk

Choňkovce (Hungarian: Alsóhunkóc, Rusyn: Хоньківцї) is a village and municipality in the Sobrance District in the Košice Region of east Slovakia. It is well known for its wine production.

== History ==
In historical records the village was first mentioned in 1409. Before the establishment of independent Czechoslovakia in 1918, Choňkovce was part of Ung County within the Kingdom of Hungary. In 1939, it was for a short time part of the Slovak Republic. As a result of the Slovak–Hungarian War of 1939, it was again part of Hungary from 1939 to 1944. In the autumn of 1944, the Red Army entered Choňkovce and it was once again part of Czechoslovakia.

== Geography ==
The municipality lies at an altitude of 200 metres (660 ft) and covers an area of 18.31 km^{2} (7.07 sq mi) (2025).

== Population ==
Population statistic (10 years)
Year	1995	2005	2015	2025
Count	604	618	541	508
Difference		+2.31%	−12.45%	−6.09%

Population statistic
Year	2024	2025
Count	511	508
Difference		−0.58%

It has a population of 508 people (31 December 2025).

=== Ethnicity ===
Census 2021 (1+ %)
Ethnicity	Number	Fraction
Slovak	473	94.22%
Rusyn	33	6.57%
Not found out	18	3.58%
Total	502	

In year 2021 was 502 people by ethnicity 473 as Slovak, 33 as Rusyn, 18 as Not found out, 1 as Ukrainian, 1 as Polish and 1 as Hungarian.

Note on population: The difference values of population numbers in the table "Population statistic" and in the sections "Ethnicity" & "Religion" is caused by the use of various statistical methods.

=== Religion ===
Census 2021 (1+ %)
Religion	Number	Fraction
Greek Catholic Church	214	42.63%
Roman Catholic Church	200	39.84%
Eastern Orthodox Church	44	8.76%
None	22	4.38%
Not found out	17	3.39%
Total	502	

In year 2021 was 502 people by religion 214 from Greek Catholic Church, 200 from Roman Catholic Church, 44 from Eastern Orthodox Church, 22 from None, 17 from Not found out, 3 from Ad hoc movements, 1 from Other and 1 from Evangelical Church.

== Culture ==
The village has a public a gym and a football pitch.

== Genealogical resources ==
The records for genealogical research are available at the state archive "Statny Archiv in Presov, Slovakia"

- Roman Catholic church records (births/marriages/deaths): 1837–1931 (parish B)
- Greek Catholic church records (births/marriages/deaths): 1792–1903 (parish A)

== See also ==
- List of municipalities and towns in Slovakia
