= Sobrance District =

Coordinates: 48°44′45″N 22°10′47″E

- District
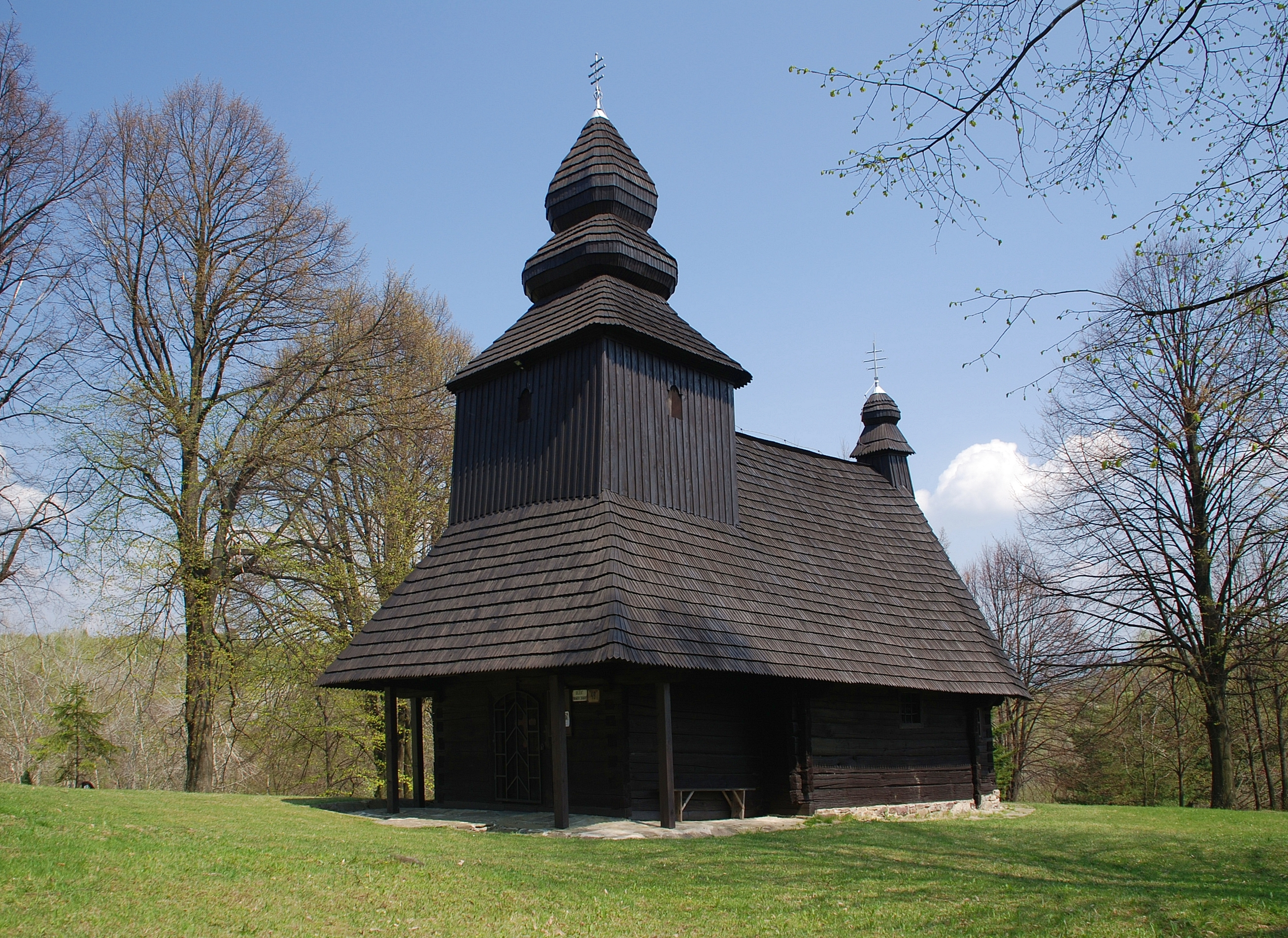
- Country: Slovakia
- Region (kraj): Košice Region
- Seat: Sobrance

Area
  - Total: 538.15 km^{2} (207.78 sq mi)

Population (2025)
  - Total: 22,118
- Time zone: UTC+1 (CET)
  - Summer (DST): UTC+2 (CEST)
- Telephone prefix: 056
- Vehicle registration plate (until 2022): SO
- Municipalities: 47

Sobrance District (Slovak: okres Sobrance) is a district in the Košice Region of eastern Slovakia. It is the easternmost district of the Košice Region. Sobrance district borders Michalovce District, Prešov Region and Ukraine. It lies mainly on a lowlands of Eastern Slovak Lowland. Sobrance district was established in 1996. The administrative, cultural end economy center is Sobrance town.

== Population ==
Population statistic (10 years)
Year	1995	2005	2015	2025
Count	23,632	23,348	22,806	22,118
Difference		−1.20%	−2.32%	−3.01%

Population statistic
Year	2024	2025
Count	22,195	22,118
Difference		−0.34%

It has a population of 22,118 people (31 December 2025).

Historical population
Year	Pop.	±%
1970	28,864	—
1980	26,373	−8.6%
1991	24,099	−8.6%
2001	23,776	−1.3%
2011	22,933	−3.5%
2021	22,440	−2.1%
Source: Statistical Office of the Slovak Republic

=== Ethnicity ===
Census 2021 (1+ %)
Ethnicity	Number	Fraction
Slovak	19,987	82.65%
Romani	1866	7.71%
Not found out	871	3.6%
Rusyn	675	2.79%
Ukrainian	368	1.52%
Total	24,182	

In year 2021 was 24,182 people by ethnicity 19,987 as Slovak, 1866 as Romani, 871 as Not found out, 675 as Rusyn, 368 as Ukrainian, 130 as Hungarian, 126 as Czech, 64 as Other, 23 as Polish, 16 as Russian, 9 as German, 8 as English, 7 as Romanian, 5 as Bulgarian, 4 as Jewish, 4 as Austrian, 3 as Irish, 3 as Vietnamese, 3 as Moravian, 2 as Chinese, 2 as Italian, 2 as Canadian, 2 as Croatian, 1 as Turkish and 1 as Greek.

Note on population: The difference values of population numbers in the table "Population statistic" and in the sections "Ethnicity" & "Religion" is caused by the use of various statistical methods.

=== Religion ===
Census 2021 (1+ %)
Religion	Number	Fraction
Roman Catholic Church	8279	36.89%
Greek Catholic Church	7712	34.37%
None	2057	9.17%
Eastern Orthodox Church	1565	6.97%
Calvinist Church	1131	5.04%
Not found out	903	4.02%
Jehovah's Witnesses	339	1.51%
Total	22,440	

In year 2021 was 22,440 people by religion 8279 from Roman Catholic Church, 7712 from Greek Catholic Church, 2057 from None, 1565 from Eastern Orthodox Church, 1131 from Calvinist Church, 903 from Not found out, 339 from Jehovah's Witnesses, 190 from Evangelical Church, 96 from Apostolic Church, 34 from Christian Congregations in Slovakia, 30 from Other and not ascertained christian church, 19 from Church of the Brethren, 18 from Other, 16 from Ad hoc movements, 15 from United Methodist Church, 12 from Seventh-day Adventist Church, 8 from Buddhism, 7 from Islam, 3 from Paganism and natural spirituality, 2 from Jewish community, 1 from Old Catholic Church, 1 from Hinduism, 1 from Baptists Church and 1 from Bahá'i Community.

== Municipalities ==
Municipality	Area [km^{2}]	Population
Baškovce	6.21	212
Beňatina	18.64	163
Bežovce	29.52	995
Blatná Polianka	9.98	172
Blatné Remety	6.22	625
Blatné Revištia	5.15	224
Bunkovce	7.78	380
Fekišovce	4.75	294
Hlivištia	20.20	350
Horňa	6.73	318
Husák (village)	14.80	159
Choňkovce	18.31	508
Inovce	10.59	182
Jasenov	7.21	274
Jenkovce	14.86	416
Kolibabovce	3.82	198
Koňuš	23.23	332
Koromľa	13.06	412
Krčava	8.73	436
Kristy	7.89	346
Lekárovce	12.35	835
Nižná Rybnica	8.99	416
Nižné Nemecké	7.25	307
Orechová	3.39	253
Ostrov	11.11	306
Petrovce	16.46	210
Pinkovce	3.31	174
Podhoroď	16.60	315
Porostov	7.28	183
Porúbka	10.82	392
Priekopa	12.67	282
Remetské Hámre	24.61	537
Ruská Bystrá	11.77	109
Ruskovce	6.63	236
Ruský Hrabovec	16.85	272
Sejkov	7.02	205
Sobrance	10.67	5,748
Svätuš	3.85	95
Tašuľa	6.02	204
Tibava	10.64	528
Úbrež	17.41	1,141
Veľké Revištia	10.19	484
Vojnatina	7.70	241
Vyšná Rybnica	40.08	396
Vyšné Nemecké	3.76	246
Vyšné Remety	5.36	382
Záhor	7.72	625

Population and area values are current for year 2025.
