= Defence Force of the Slovak Republic =

War eagle of the Slovak Republic

Defence Force of the Slovak Republic (other names: Slovak Armed Forces, Slovak Army) was the name of the Slovak Army during the Second World War. The Slovak Army existed and functioned until the outbreak of the Slovak National Uprising, in which it was reorganized into the Domobrana. It fought on the side of Nazi Germany and during its existence fought in Poland, Hungary, Romania, the Soviet Union and some of its units even managed to reach the Caucasus alongside the Wehrmacht. In the final phase of the war, its units also operated in Italy, Romania, and Hungary.

== Creation ==
The Army was created, and severely disorganised during the Slovak-Hungarian War. The Hungarian government exploited the severe crisis in the area to reclaim "lost hungarian lands" as was part of Hungarian revisionism. During the Czechoslovak Army, the only Slovak general was Rudolf Viest, the later commander of the Slovak National Uprising. For this reason, many Czech officers partook in the fight against Hungary, as they were persuaded by the Slovak government to remain. The Germans failed to act upon their treaty of defense towards Tiso's government, and instead acted as a mediator. This helped lead to an independent Slovak foreign policy until the purge of 1940.

== Slovak-Hungarian War ==
At five o'clock in the morning on March 23, 1939, Hungarian troops invaded the Snina and Sobrance districts in three streams. The leading units advanced with white flags, often in captured Czechoslovak uniforms. In view of this, they occupied many border posts without a fight. Before noon, they reached the demarcation line approved by Hitler and crossed it in several places.

The Hungarian invasion provoked a wave of resistance in Slovakia. Thousands of volunteers signed up for the First Army and the MNO ordered the Hlinka Guard to be armed. However, the commander of the Eastern Group of Troops, Lieutenant Colonel Augustín Malár, did not issue the order for defense until the afternoon. Therefore, only airmen from Spišská Nová Ves participated in the battles against the aggressors.

After the arrival of reinforcements, at 4:30 a.m. on March 24, 1939, Slovak counterattack, which was to push the enemy beyond the state border according to the order of the Minister of National Defense Ferdinand Čatloš. Airmen from Spišská Nová Ves also joined the fighting again, but due to the high Hungarian superiority in heavy weapons, the Slovak units did not achieve the set goals. The Hungarian Air Force also carried out a retaliatory raid on Spišská Nová Ves. In addition to significant material damage, it claimed the lives of five soldiers and seven civilians.

Under pressure from Hitler, who did not want the Hungarian-Slovak conflict to grow into larger proportions, an armistice was concluded on the evening of March 24, 1939. Local skirmishes nevertheless continued for another five weeks. The last battle with the use of artillery took place on April 20–21, 1939 near the village of Gajdoš.

The Slovak government hoped that Germany would honor its obligations under the "Protection Treaty". However, Berlin did not support Tiso's cabinet and may not even insist on the invariability of the borders. In this situation, the Slovak government was forced to sign a protocol on April 4, 1939, which legalized the forcible annexation of a territory with an area of 1,168 km2, the size of Budapest. According to the 1930 census, it was inhabited by 40,100 people, almost exclusively of Slovak or Russian nationality.
