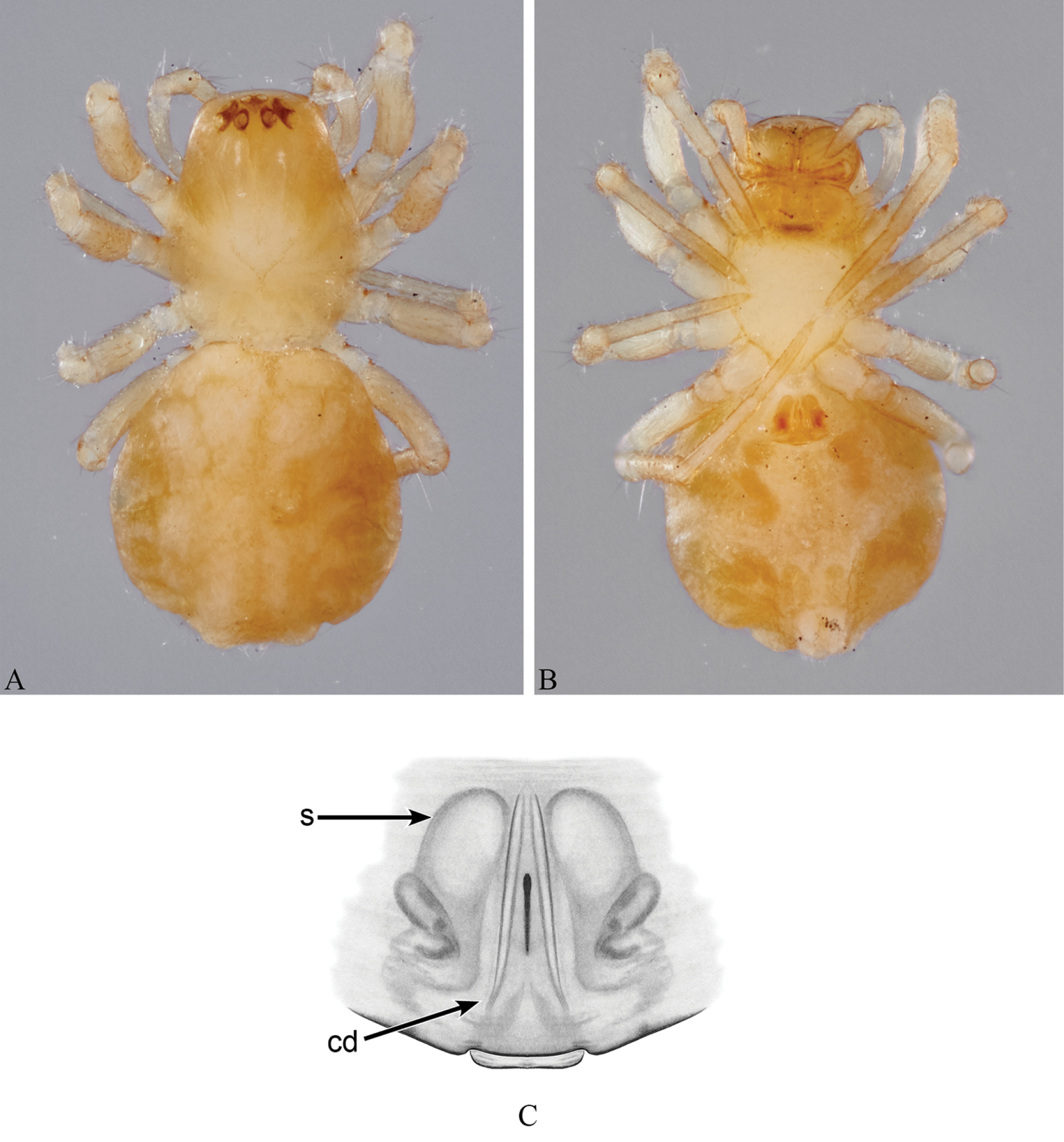
- Gongylidiellum uschuaiense

Scientific classification
- Kingdom: Animalia
- Phylum: Arthropoda
- Subphylum: Chelicerata
- Class: Arachnida
- Order: Araneae
- Infraorder: Araneomorphae
- Family: Linyphiidae
- Genus: Gongylidiellum; Simon, 1884

Type species
- G. latebricola (O. Pickard-Cambridge, 1871)

Species
- 18, see text

= Gongylidiellum =

Genus of spiders

Gongylidiellum is a genus of dwarf spiders that was first described by Eugène Louis Simon in 1884.

== Species ==
As of May 2019 it contains eighteen species, found in Algeria, Angola, Argentina, China, Georgia, India, Japan, Mongolia, Nepal, Pakistan, Romania, Russia, Turkey, Turkmenistan, the United States, and Vietnam:

- Gongylidiellum blandum Miller, 1970 – Angola
- Gongylidiellum bracteatum Zhao & Li, 2014 – China
- Gongylidiellum caucasicum Tanasevitch & Ponomarev, 2015 – Russia (Caucasus)
- Gongylidiellum confusum Thaler, 1987 – India, Pakistan
- Gongylidiellum crassipes Denis, 1952 – Romania
- Gongylidiellum edentatum Miller, 1951 – Central, southern Europe
- Gongylidiellum hipponense (Simon, 1926) – Algeria
- Gongylidiellum kathmanduense Wunderlich, 1983 – Nepal
- Gongylidiellum latebricola (O. Pickard-Cambridge, 1871) (type) – Europe, Russia (Europe to West Siberia)
- Gongylidiellum linguiformis Tu & Li, 2004 – Vietnam
- Gongylidiellum minutum (Banks, 1892) – USA
- Gongylidiellum murcidum Simon, 1884 – Europe, Turkey, Russia (Europe to West Siberia), Turkmenistan, Japan
- Gongylidiellum nepalense Wunderlich, 1983 – India, Nepal
- Gongylidiellum nigrolimbatum Caporiacco, 1935 – Karakorum
- Gongylidiellum orduense Wunderlich, 1995 – Turkey, Caucasus (Russia, Georgia)
- Gongylidiellum tennesseense Petrunkevitch, 1925 – USA
- Gongylidiellum uschuaiense Simon, 1902 – Argentina
- Gongylidiellum vivum (O. Pickard-Cambridge, 1875) – Europe, North Africa, Turkey, Caucasus
