= Slovak–Hungarian War order of battle: Hungary =

The following is the Hungarian order of battle in 1939 during the Slovak–Hungarian War.

== Overview ==
The condition of the Hungarian Armed Forces was in stark contrast to that of the Slovaks. Because of the small army imposed on them after World War I, the Hungarians had had to concentrate on raising the quality rather than the number of their troops, resulting in a small, but highly professional cadre. Their air force, motorised and cavalry brigades had all been substantially re-equipped with modern German and Italian equipment in the mid-1930s, and the pick of them had been assembled for the invasion of Ruthenia and the subsequent thrust into eastern Slovakia, both of which they conducted with speed and efficiency.

== VII Corps ==
Commander-in-Chief: Major-General András Littay

- 9th Independent Battalion (partially)
- 7th Independent Battalion
- 24th Independent Battalion
- 8th Honved Battalion
- 1st Cavalry Battalion (supported by 24 Ansaldo 35M tankettes)
- 2nd Cavalry Battalion (supported by 24 Ansaldo 35M tankettes)
- 2nd Motorised Battalion (supported by 5 Fiat 3000B light tanks, 22 Ansaldo 35M tankettes and 3 Crossley 29M armoured cars)

== The Hungarian Air Force ==
Ist Group/1st Fighter Regiment

- 1./1.V.szd. (based in Užhorod with 9 Fiat CR.32 fighter aircraft)
- 1./2.V.szd. (based in Miskolc with 9 Fiat CR.32 fighter aircraft)
- 1./3.V.szd. (based in Csop with 9 Fiat CR.32 fighter aircraft)
- VI.KF.szd. (based in Debrecen with 9 Manfred Weiss WM-16 tactical reconnaissance aircraft)
- VII.KF.szd. (based in Miskolc with 9 Manfred Weiss WM-21 tactical reconnaissance aircraft)

IInd Group/3rd Bomber Regiment

- 3./3.KB.szd. (based in Debrecen with 6 Junkers Ju-86K-2 bomber aircraft)
- 3./4.KB.szd. (based in Debrecen with 6 Junkers Ju-86K-2 bomber aircraft)
- 3./5.KB.szd. (based in Debrecen with 6 Junkers Ju-86K-2 bomber aircraft)

== Sources ==
- Axworthy, Mark W.A. Axis Slovakia - Hitler's Slavic Wedge, 1938-1945, Bayside, N.Y. : Axis Europa Books, 2002, ISBN 1-891227-41-6
