= Pseudosparianthis =

Pseudosparianthis Temporal range: Neogene– Present

Scientific classification
- Kingdom: Animalia
- Phylum: Arthropoda
- Subphylum: Chelicerata
- Class: Arachnida
- Order: Araneae
- Infraorder: Araneomorphae
- Family: Sparassidae
- Genus: Pseudosparianthis; Simon, 1887

Type species
- P. fusca Simon, 1887

Species
- 8, see text

Genus of spiders

Pseudosparianthis is a genus of huntsman spiders that was first described by Eugène Louis Simon in 1887.

== Species ==
As of September 2019 it contains eight species, found in the Caribbean, Central America, Guyana, Venezuela, Brazil, and French Guiana:

- Pseudosparianthis accentuata Caporiacco, 1955 – Venezuela
- Pseudosparianthis ambigua Caporiacco, 1938 – Guatemala
- Pseudosparianthis chickeringi (Gertsch, 1941) – Panama
- Pseudosparianthis fusca Simon, 1887 (type) – Brazil
- Pseudosparianthis jayuyae Petrunkevitch, 1930 – Puerto Rico
- Pseudosparianthis megalopalpa Caporiacco, 1954 – French Guiana
- Pseudosparianthis picta Simon, 1887 – Brazil, Guyana
- Pseudosparianthis ravida Simon, 1898 – St. Vincent
