= Sobrance =

Sobrance Szobránc
- Municipality
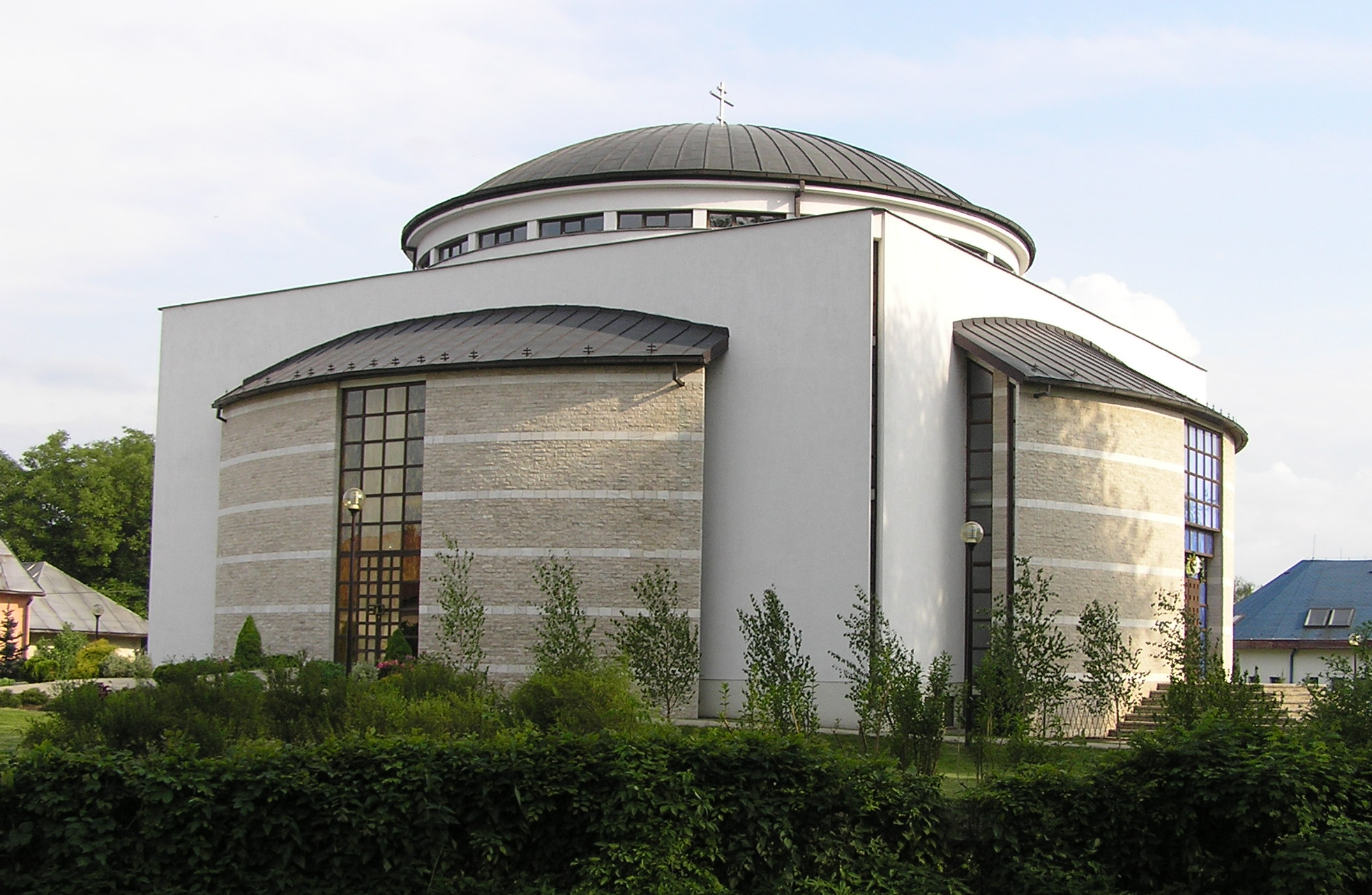
- Greek Catholic Church of the Holy Seven Slavonic Saints

- Flag Coat of arms

- Location of Sobrance in the Košice Region Location of Sobrance in Slovakia
- Coordinates: 48.74°N 22.18°E
- Country: Slovakia
- Region: Košice Region
- District: Sobrance District
- First mentioned: 1344

Government
  - Mayor: Pavol Džurina

Area
  - Total: 10.67 km^{2} (4.12 sq mi)
- Elevation: 123 m (404 ft)

Population (2025)
  - Total: 5,748
- Time zone: UTC+1 (CET)
  - Summer (DST): UTC+2 (CEST)
- Postal code: 730 1
- Area code: +421 56
- Vehicle registration plate (until 2022): SO
- Website: www.sobrance.sk

Sobrance (German: Sobranz, Hungarian: Szobránc, Rusyn: Собранцї) is a town in Košice Region, Slovakia, around 15 kilometres (9 miles) from Uzhhorod, Ukraine, and 22 kilometres (14 miles) east of Michalovce. Located in the Eastern Slovak Lowland not far from the Vihorlat Mountains, it is the easternmost town in Slovakia.

== Geography ==
The municipality lies at an altitude of 123 metres (404 ft) and covers an area of 10.67 km^{2} (4.12 sq mi) (2025).

== Etymology ==
The name comes from a Slavic personal name + patronimic suffix -ce, compare with similar Czech name Sebran ("picked up child") and Sebranice. The first written record comes from 1409 (Zobranch). Older literature can mention also incorrect date 1344.

== History ==
In 1910, the town had 1216 inhabitants, 538 Hungarians and 577 Slovaks. Before the establishment of independent Czechoslovakia in 1918, Sobrance was part of Ung County within the Kingdom of Hungary. It became the capital city of its own district. In 1939, Sobrance was for a short time part of the Slovak Republic. As a result of the Slovak–Hungarian War of 1939, it was again part of Hungary from 1939 to 1944. During the Second World War the town was heavily damaged. On 23 November 1944, the Red Army entered Sobrance and it was once again part of Czechoslovakia, but did not immediately regain its district status. Since the Dissolution of Czechoslovakia, Sobrance has been part of independent Slovakia. It regained its district town status in 1996.

The first reference to Jewish residents appears in the May 15, 1739 Jewish Conscription of Ung County which recorded only one Jewish family. The head of the household was Marko Joseffovics (Marko the son of Josef), a distiller of whisky (palinka, slivovica or vodka). By July 1746 there were two Jewish families—Marko Joseffovics and Hersko Abrahamovics (Hersko the son of Abraham). The Chevra Kadisha or burial society was founded in about 1780, a time when the Jewish population of northeastern Hungary began to grow due to migrations from Galicia. Their percentage stood at 24.3% in 1910. Menashe Simcha Friedman (b.1855- d.1926) was the town Rabbi and was known as the Sobrance Rov. The synagogue, which was still standing in 1929, was built in about 1800. Following the Nazi invasion of Hungary on May 17, 1944, all of the Jews living in Sobrance were deported to Auschwitz concentration camp as part of the Final Solution where most were murdered upon arrival. The property and belongings that were left behind were looted in a thoroughly organized act by the local non-Jewish population of Sobrance soon after the deportation.

== Sights ==
To the north of the town is Sobranecké kúpele, once a popular spa before the First World War. Today it is totally abandoned.

A Guitar museum is located in the town. The collection includes more than 200 guitars mainly from the period of 1947–1980. Perhaps the most valuable guitar is a Resonet Grazioso/Futurama from early in the career of George Harrison.

An Eastern Catholic Church of the Holy Seven Slavonic Saints (Sedmočislenici) was built in the town. It is a modern church building based on traditional Byzantine architecture models.

== Population ==
Historical population
Year	Pop.	±%
1970	3,394	—
1980	3,896	+14.8%
1991	5,754	+47.7%
2001	6,262	+8.8%
2011	5,981	−4.5%
2021	5,875	−1.8%
Source: Censuses

Population statistic (10 years)
Year	1995	2005	2015	2025
Count	6199	6264	6092	5748
Difference		+1.04%	−2.74%	−5.64%

Population statistic
Year	2024	2025
Count	5789	5748
Difference		−0.70%

It has a population of 5748 people (31 December 2025).

=== Ethnicity ===
Census 2021 (1+ %)
Ethnicity	Number	Fraction
Slovak	4677	79.6%
Romani	1051	17.88%
Not found out	146	2.48%
Ukrainian	115	1.95%
Rusyn	107	1.82%
Total	5875	

In year 2021 was 5875 people by ethnicity 4677 as Slovak, 1051 as Romani, 146 as Not found out, 115 as Ukrainian, 107 as Rusyn, 37 as Czech, 18 as Hungarian, 17 as Other, 5 as Romanian, 3 as Vietnamese, 3 as Russian, 3 as Polish, 3 as Bulgarian, 2 as Chinese, 2 as Irish, 2 as Moravian, 2 as Croatian, 1 as Jewish and 1 as English.

Note on population: The difference values of population numbers in the table "Population statistic" and in the sections "Ethnicity" & "Religion" is caused by the use of various statistical methods.

=== Religion ===
Census 2021 (1+ %)
Religion	Number	Fraction
Roman Catholic Church	2549	43.39%
Greek Catholic Church	2008	34.18%
None	688	11.71%
Eastern Orthodox Church	252	4.29%
Not found out	190	3.23%
Calvinist Church	98	1.67%
Total	5875	

In year 2021 was 5875 people by religion 2549 from Roman Catholic Church, 2008 from Greek Catholic Church, 688 from None, 252 from Eastern Orthodox Church, 190 from Not found out, 98 from Calvinist Church, 41 from Evangelical Church, 18 from Jehovah's Witnesses, 8 from Other and not ascertained christian church, 5 from Islam, 4 from Christian Congregations in Slovakia, 4 from Other, 3 from United Methodist Church, 2 from Buddhism, 2 from Ad hoc movements, 1 from Jewish community, 1 from Church of the Brethren and 1 from Bahá'i Community.

== Twin towns – sister cities ==
Sobrance is twinned with:

- Cigánd, Hungary
- Lubaczów, Poland
- Perechyn, Ukraine

== Notable people ==
- Julij Feldesi (1875–1947), Rusyn printer and politician

== See also ==
- List of municipalities and towns in Slovakia
