= George Sabo =

Slovak-born American publisher (1896–1983)

George Sabo (January 18, 1896 – February 15, 1983) was a Slovak-born American publisher and book dealer specializing in Slavic-language materials.

== Biography ==
Sabo was born in Orechova, Slovakia and immigrated to New York in July 1913. Sabo was inspired to become a book dealer as a child when his father took him to Julij Feldesi's bookstore. He became a naturalized American citizen in April 1926.

In 1936, Sabo began his work as a book dealer with the purchase of 18,000 Russian books. With John M. Constantinoff and Israel Perlstein, Sabo is considered to be "well-established in the historiography of the Russian antiquarian book in New York". One of his clients was Russian bibliophile Andrey Avinoff. Another important client was Paul M. Fekula, whose collection of Slavica was the largest assembled by an individual in the United States. Sabo also contributed Slavic books to the University of Illinois Urbana-Champaign, helping the University develop the largest Slavic collection west of the Mississippi by the 1970s. In addition to his work as a book dealer, Sabo was also involved in the publication of Rusyn books and periodicals. Until the 1950s, Sabo's publishing house was one of the two largest sources of Rusyn-American literature. He also served as Secretary of the Supreme Tribunal of the Greek Catholic Union. Sabo later moved to Melbourne, Florida, where he continued his business under the name Slavic Books.

After his death, the majority of his 16,000 book collection was acquired by Sterling C. Evans Library at Texas A & M University. An additional 432 books from his collection were donated to Seton Hall University Library in 2012.
