= John M. Constantinoff =

Russian book dealer and collector

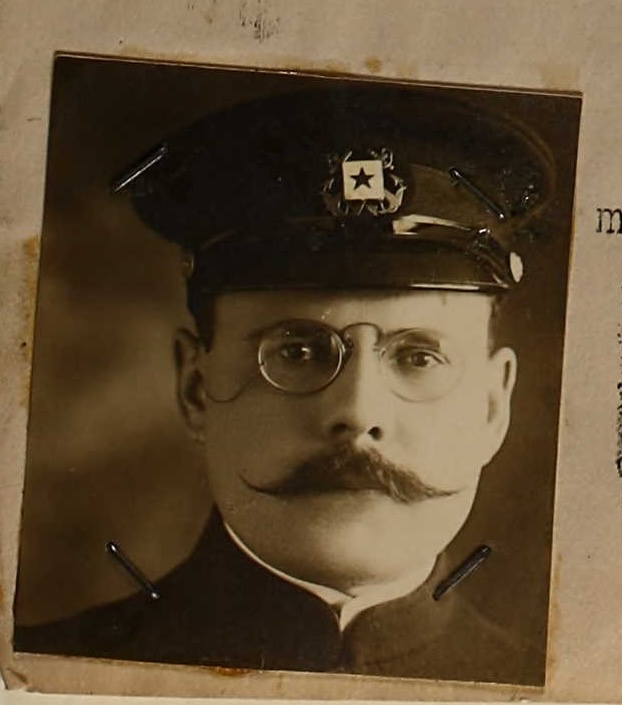
John M. Constantinoff in 1921

John M. Constantinoff (Russian: Иван Михайлович Константинов, Ivan Mikhailovitch Konstantinov; April 10, 1881 – May 6, 1962) was a Russian book dealer and collector.

== Biography ==
Constantinoff was born in Russia in 1881 but was working at the Russian Embassy in Brussels in 1908 In 1914, while employed as the second carpenter on the SS Kroonland, he participated in the rescue operation of the SS Volturno. Constantinoff was on the first lifeboat sent at 8 p.m. to the ship and assisted in the Kroonland's rescue of 76 passengers. He and the Kroonland's other sailors received a Congressional Silver Medal for their rescue efforts in a ceremony hosted by Commerce Secretary William C. Redfield.

Around 1918, Constantinoff immigrated to the United States, where he settled in New York City In December 1918 he participated in the second convention of the anti-Bolshevik Federation of Russian Organizations in America, held at Beethoven Hall in Manhattan. Constantinoff ran for chairman of the group with the support of the fraternal and religious organizations at the convention, against Konstantin Oberuchev, the candidate of the Federation's Mensheviks. After both candidates failed to win a majority, the convention agreed for them to each serve as vice-chairman. At the next day's meeting, he was unsuccessful in preventing the collapse of the talks, following accusations from some delegates that the organization had been infiltrated by supporters of the Tsar.

In New York he wrote for the Russian-language weekly newspaper Rodnaya Rech (Native Tongue) in 1918 and was one of the five directors of the Rodnaya Rech Publishing Corporation. The paper was associated with the Progressive Party in its political orientation. Constantinoff later wrote for the newspaper Syn Otechestva (Sons of the Fatherland), a continuation of Rodnaya Rech published from 1919 on. Despite his anti-Bolshevik activities in 1918, Constantinoff was a registered member of the left-wing American Labor Party in the 1948 and 1949 elections.

Constantinoff and his book business have become "well-established in the historiography of the Russian book trade in New York", along with Israel Perlstein and George Sabo. He began collecting and selling books at some point after 1918, with advertisements for his business, called the "Rare Russian Library", appearing in Russian publications as early as 1925. In a letter from 1953, Constantinoff wrote that he did not depend on his book business for money but had another source of employment. He established a reputation as "an expert antiquarian bookseller" in New York.

The primary sources of his collections were a small number of book dealers specializing in Russian materials, such as Viktor Kamkin and George Sabo, as well as corporations in New York and Moscow like Mezhdunarodnaya Kniga. By the 1940s, he also advertised in The American Bookfinder for English-language books on theosophy, by authors such as Archibald Keightley and William Quan Judge. These books in English were for his personal collection and not part of the Rare Russian Library.

Constantinoff moved to Los Angeles in August 1951. His move was likely suggested by his friend Violet Trevor, who lived in Los Angeles and shared his interest in theosophy and the occult. In Los Angeles, he lived at and continued to operate his Rare Russian Library from 1824 2/6 Grace Ave., Hollywood. After his death, he left his collection of books to Violet Trevor. Trevor's family donated Constantinoff's book collection and archives to Stanford University in 1987.

== Collection ==
The Constantinoff Collection has been described as "a major collection of Russian occult literature that is particularly rich in materials from the nineteenth and early twentieth centuries". Approximately half of the collection consists of Russian-language theosophical books and periodicals, by authors such as Helena Blavatsky and Rudolf Steiner. In addition to occult subjects, the Collection also contains books from Constantinoff's Rare Russian Library, with volumes from imperial libraries, including the libraries of Emperor Alexander III and his wife Maria Feodorovna, as well as Maria Alexandrovna. Books from imperial collections like these could be obtained for very little money following the Russian Revolution, allowing dealers like Constantinoff to acquire large numbers for an average price of $2.
