= Federation of Russian Organizations in America =

Defunct political organization founded in 1918

The Federation of Russian Organizations in America was an anti-Bolshevik organization founded in New York in 1918.

== History ==
The group emerged from the All-Russian Civic Convention held at Arlington Hall in February 1918, an attempt to unite Russian groups in the United States. This was the second of two rival conventions held that month for Russian immigrants: one for the Federation of Russian Socialist Societies and the other for the more conservative Federation of Russian Organizations in America. The group presented itself as the representative of all non-Bolshevik Russians, including the "69 races inhabiting the territory of Russia, [and] the preachers of the 99 religions". Despite its name, the group also included Russian organizations from Canada. The chairman of the convention was Apollinary Dimitrievich Semenovsky. Supporters of the Bolsheviks attempted to protest and disrupt the meeting. The convention's delegates decided to organize the group around local councils with an executive committee of 15 members. The organization also changed the group's name from the United Russian Organizations of the United States to the Federation of Russian Organizations in America. Alexander Petrunkevitch, one of the group's founders, became the president of the Federation.

Throughout the next year, the group was involved in political advocacy. In March, the group sent a telegram to President Wilson, protesting the use of Japanese troops to Siberia. The group had many supporters of Kerensky's Socialist Revolutionaries and argued that Wilson should send Russian volunteers to fight in World War I against both Germany and the Bolsheviks. The organization leased a five-story brownstone at 99 Riverside Drive, and planned to give it to Kerensky to live in.

The Federation's second convention was held in December 1918, at Beethoven Hall in Manhattan. The meeting was disrupted by accusations of tsarist sympathies, and antisemitism, after a delegate advocated for the murder of Russia's Jews. The speech was denounced by the other delegates and it was later revealed that the anti-Semitic speaker was not actually Russian and he was expelled from the meeting. The convention was characterized by tensions between rival political factions, with 156 of the 200 delegates leaving in frustration during the convention's first day due to a lack of progress. After being unable to agree on one chairman, the convention instituted a joint chairmanship shared between Konstantin Oberuchev and John M. Constantinoff.

In addition to politics, the group focused on three issues of medical aid, education, and legal aid, for Russians in America. Due to political differences, the Federation was unsuccessful in attracting the support of Bolsheviks for its educational activities so it was decided to pursue the Federation's educational activities through the independent Russian Collegiate Institute of New York. The Institute was established on March 15, 1919, and it continued to exist through 1924. Attendance declined following the Palmer Raids, since Russian immigrants feared their meetings could paint them as radicals.

The New York Public Library holds an archive of correspondence and manuscripts related to the Federation. This collection was secured for the Library thanks to the efforts of Avrahm Yarmolinsky.
