= Konstantin Oberuchev =

Russian revolutionary and writer (1864–1929)

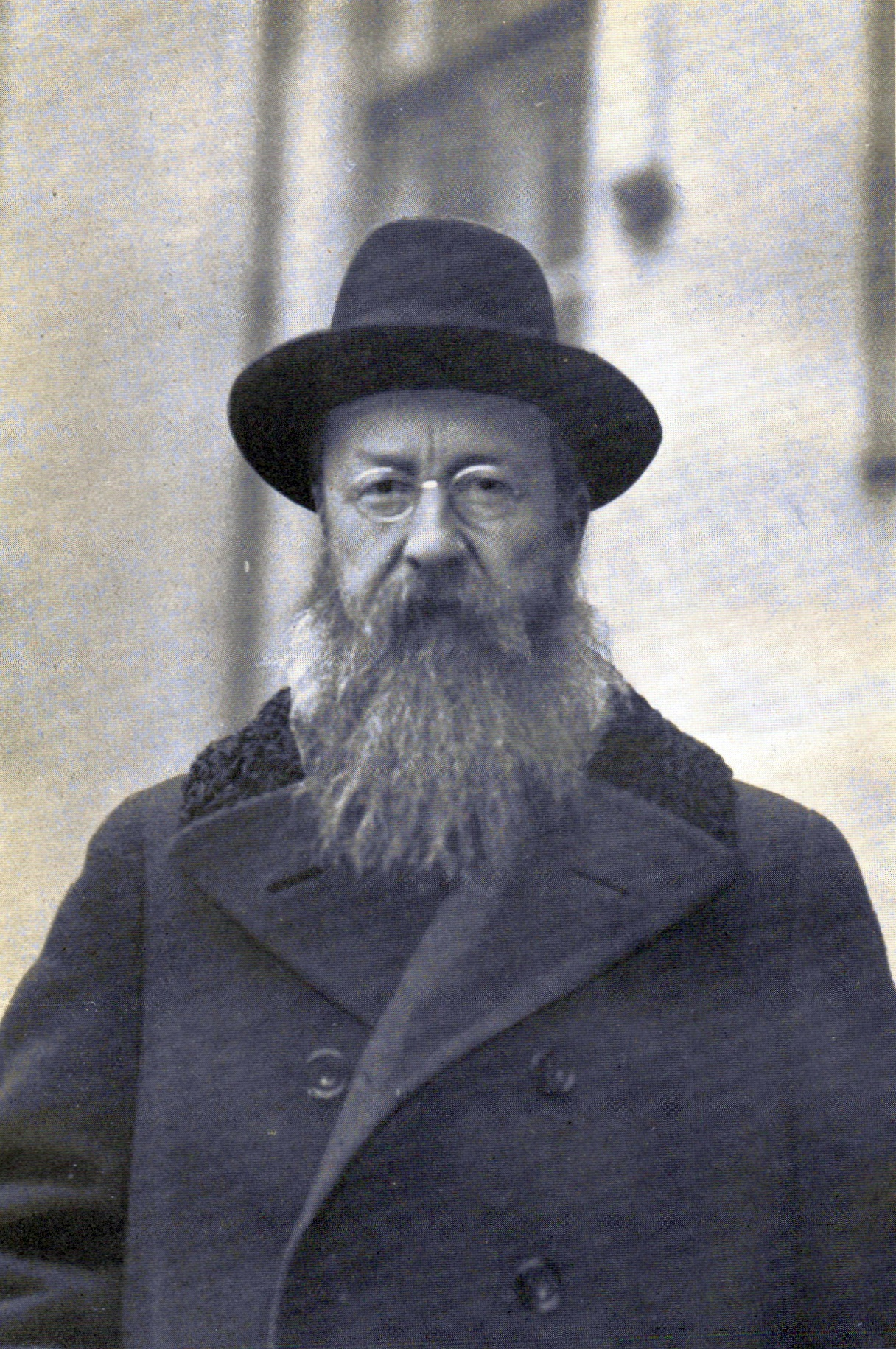

Konstantin Mikhailovich Oberuchev (June 4, 1864 – September 29, 1929) was a Russian revolutionary and writer.

== Biography ==
Oberuchev attended the Mikhailovskaya Military Artillery Academy. In 1888, while living in St. Petersburg, he joined Narodnaya Volya. In 1913, Oberuchev was arrested in Moscow for political activities and exiled from Russia for three years. Following this exile, he returned to Russia a few days before the February Revolution, where he was arrested again. He was the commander of the Kiev Military District for eight months in 1917. During this period, Oberuchev was an opponent of Ukrainian nationalism, believing that "both Ukrainians and Bolsheviks were destroying the army for their own agendas". He argued against the formation of separate Ukrainian military units, and was also opposed to the creation of a Czechoslovak army. Following the October Revolution, Oberuchev was invited to serve in Lenin's government but he did not agree to the offer, as he was opposed to the Bolsheviks' politics.

He immigrated to the United States in April 1918. In the United States, he was active in several anti-Bolshevik organizations. He was active in the Federation of Russian Organizations in America, which advocated for a democratic government in Russia. During the Federation's second convention in 1918, he stood for election as the organization's chairman, running as the Menshevik candidate against John M. Constantinoff. In July 1919, he established the Fund for the Relief of Men of Letters and Scientists in Russia.
