= Úbrež =

Úbrež Ubrezs
- Municipality
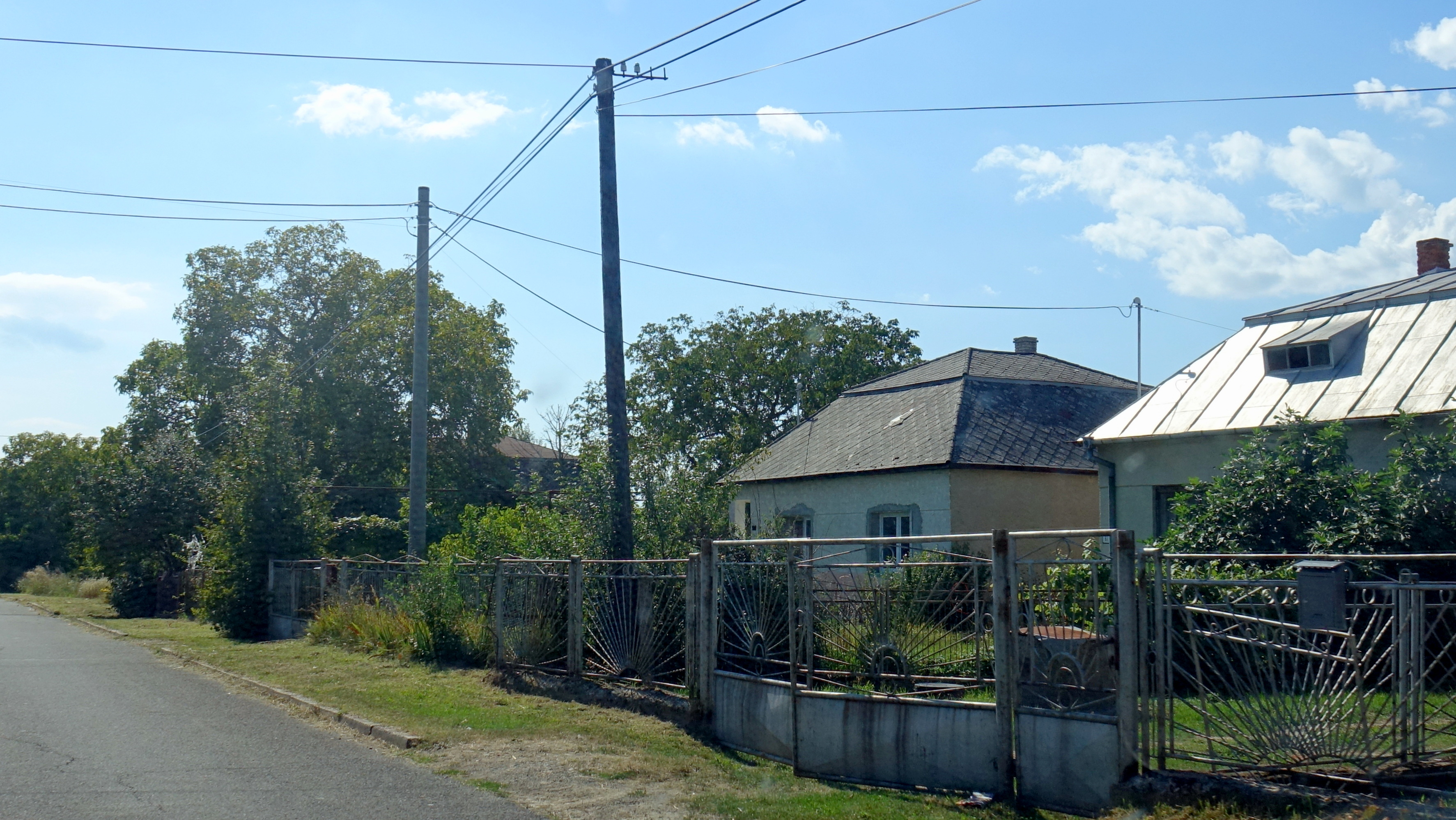

- Flag

- Location of Úbrež in the Košice Region Location of Úbrež in Slovakia
- Coordinates: 48.78°N 22.13°E
- Country: Slovakia
- Region: Košice Region
- District: Sobrance District
- First mentioned: 1337

Area
  - Total: 17.41 km^{2} (6.72 sq mi)
- Elevation: 135 m (443 ft)

Population (2025)
  - Total: 1,141
- Time zone: UTC+1 (CET)
  - Summer (DST): UTC+2 (CEST)
- Postal code: 724 2
- Area code: +421 56
- Vehicle registration plate (until 2022): SO
- Website: www.obecubrez.sk

Úbrež (Hungarian: Ubrezs) is a village and municipality in the Sobrance District in the Košice Region of east Slovakia. In historical records the village was first mentioned in 1337. The village lies at an altitude of 130 metres and covers an area of 17.418 km^{2}. It has a population of 1141 people. The village has a public gym, school, and soccer pitch.

== Geography ==
The municipality lies at an altitude of 135 metres (443 ft) and covers an area of 17.41 km^{2} (6.72 sq mi) (2025).

== Population ==
Population statistic (10 years)
| Year | 1995 | 2005 | 2015 | 2025 |
|---|---|---|---|---|
| Count | 575 | 648 | 773 | 1141 |
| Difference | | +12.69% | +19.29% | +47.60% |

Population statistic
| Year | 2024 | 2025 |
|---|---|---|
| Count | 1112 | 1141 |
| Difference | | +2.60% |

It has a population of 1141 people (31 December 2025).

=== Ethnicity ===
Census 2021 (1+ %)
| Ethnicity | Number | Fraction |
|---|---|---|
| Slovak | 824 | 80.62% |
| Romani | 303 | 29.64% |
| Not found out | 107 | 10.46% |
| Ukrainian | 72 | 7.04% |
| Hungarian | 23 | 2.25% |
| Total | 1022 | |

In year 2021 was 1022 people by ethnicity 824 as Slovak, 303 as Romani, 107 as Not found out, 72 as Ukrainian, 23 as Hungarian, 9 as Rusyn, 2 as Jewish, 2 as Other, 1 as Czech, 1 as Turkish and 1 as Russian.

Note on population: The difference values of population numbers in the table "Population statistic" and in the sections "Ethnicity" & "Religion" is caused by the use of various statistical methods.

=== Religion ===
Census 2021 (1+ %)
| Religion | Number | Fraction |
|---|---|---|
| Roman Catholic Church | 412 | 40.31% |
| Eastern Orthodox Church | 243 | 23.78% |
| None | 131 | 12.82% |
| Greek Catholic Church | 118 | 11.55% |
| Not found out | 94 | 9.2% |
| Jehovah's Witnesses | 11 | 1.08% |
| Total | 1022 | |

In year 2021 was 1022 people by religion 412 from Roman Catholic Church, 243 from Eastern Orthodox Church, 131 from None, 118 from Greek Catholic Church, 94 from Not found out, 11 from Jehovah's Witnesses, 5 from Calvinist Church, 4 from Evangelical Church, 3 from Seventh-day Adventist Church and 1 from Apostolic Church.
