= Julij Feldesi =

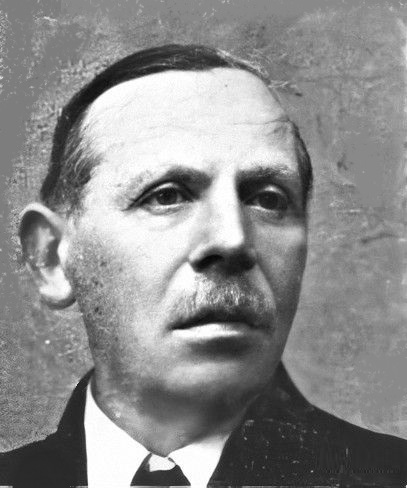
Julij Feldesi in 1940

Julij Feldesi (Ukrainian: Юлій Фельдеши, Hungarian Földesi Gyula, 1875–1947) was a Rusyn printer and politician.

== Biography ==
Julij Feldesi was born in Szobránc, in the Ung County of the Kingdom of Hungary (present-day Sobrance, Slovakia). After his studies, he became a printer in Ungvár (today Uzhhorod, Ukraine). He was successful in this occupation, with clients as far away as the United States.

After the treaty of Trianon he became the member of a Czechoslovak political party, the Autonomous Agrarian Union. It was as a member of this organization that he was elected member of the Senate of Czechoslovakia, serving from 1935 to 1938. After the Hungarian annexion of Carpathian Ruthenia, Feldesi was elected member of the Diet of Hungary.

In 1944, when the Red Army advanced into Carpathian Ruthenia, Feldesi was arrested and later committed to life imprisonment as a collaborator. He died in the Sambir prison in 1947.
