= Sebranice =

Sebranice may refer to places in the Czech Republic:

- Sebranice (Blansko District), a municipality and village in the South Moravian Region
- Sebranice (Svitavy District), a municipality and village in the Pardubice Region
