= András Littay =

Hungarian general

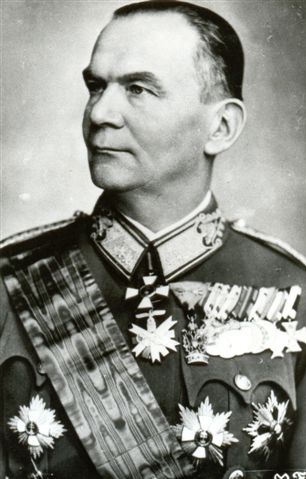
- Born: 15 August 1884; Szabadka, Kingdom of Hungary, (today Subotica, Serbia)
- Died: 21 July 1967 (age 82); Melbourne, Australia
- Military career
- Allegiance: Austria-Hungary; Hungary
- Rank: General
- Conflicts: World War I Invasion of Carpatho-Ukraine; Slovak-Hungarian War; World War II

András Littay (15 August 1884 Szabadka (Subotica), Austria-Hungary – 21 July 1967 Melbourne, Australia) was a Hungarian General during World War II. He was professor at the Budapest Military Academy and Commander of the VII Army Corps, the Deputy Minister of Defence, the Royal Hungarian Privy Councilor, a member of the Order of Vitéz.

Although a member of Hungarian military cooperating with Nazi Germany, he did not make any step on conflicts on the war.
