= Letov Š-28 =

Czechoslovak reconnaissance aircraft

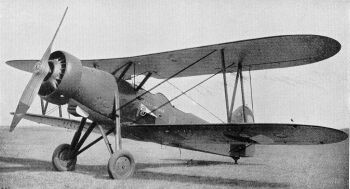

General information
- Type: Reconnaissance aircraft
- Manufacturer: Letov Kbely in Prague
- Primary user: Czechoslovak Air Force
- Number built: 470 (all variants Š-28, -128, -228, -328 and -528)

History
- Introduction date: 1934
- First flight: July 1929 (Š-28)
- Retired: 1944

The Letov Š-28 was a Czechoslovak single-engined, two-seat reconnaissance aircraft. It was manufactured by Letov Kbely in a number of versions with different powerplants. The most important version was the Š-328, which was produced in relatively high quantities (412 planes produced).

== History ==
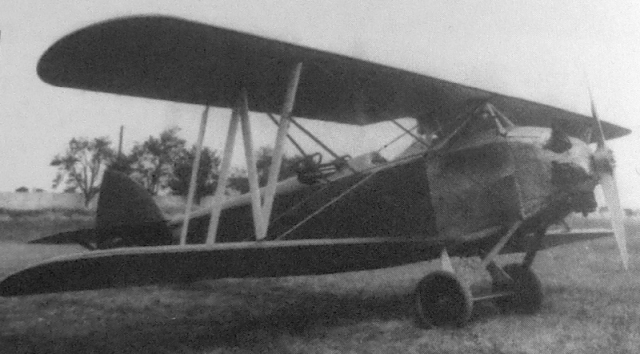
Letov Š-28 prototype

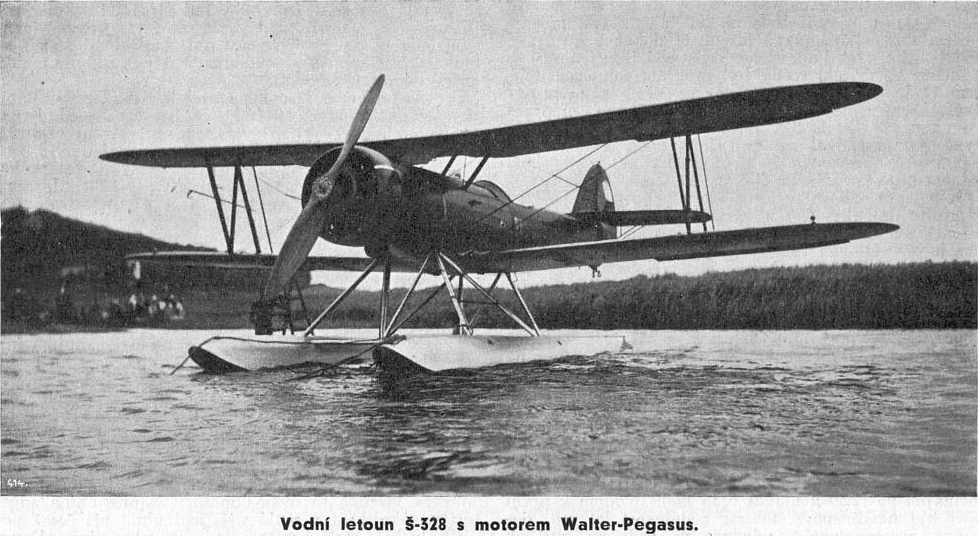
Š-328V floatplane

In the late 1920s, the Czechoslovak state-owned aircraft factory Letov proposed a smaller derivative of its successful Š-16 single-engined reconnaissance-bomber, the Š-28, to be powered by a 240 hp (180 kW) Walter Castor radial engine to the Czechoslovak Ministry of Defence (Czech: Ministerstvo národní obrany) (MNO). In September 1928, the MNO responded with an order for a single prototype to be delivered by the end of the year. Completion was delayed due to delays in receiving the engine, and the Š-28 did not fly until July 1929. No further examples of the Castor-powered Š-28 were built.

By the time that the Š-28 flew, Letov was already at work on a version powered by a licence-built Bristol Jupiter radial engine (the Walter Jupiter VI), which at 450 hp (340 kW) was much more powerful than the Castor but also much heavier. To accommodate the Jupiter, the new model, the Letov Š-128, had a redesigned engine mount and a shortened forward fuselage, while the undercarriage was also modified. The Š-128-1 prototype was first flown on 27 January 1931 and underwent factory testing until August that year, after which it was fitted with a 500 hp (370 kW) Gnome-Rhône Mercury VII engine, and as the Š-128 Mercury, carried out a demonstration tour of the Baltic. After returning from this tour, it was refitted with the Jupiter engine and handed over to the VLÚS, the Military Aviation test institute, for testing. These results were successful, and as a result, four Š-128s were ordered in October 1932, with a further twelve ordered in November 1933. These orders were largely to maintain workload at the state-owned Letov factory.

As a result of the Baltic tour by the Mercury-powered Š-128 prototype, Estonia purchased four Mercury-powered aircraft, designated Letov Š-228. The new model was powered by a Walter-license-built Mercury IV engine rated at 500 hp (370 kW), and had a further modified undercarriage and tail surfaces. Letov built a company-owner prototype, initially designated Š-128SM and later as the Š-228-5, followed by the four production aircraft (Š-228E), which were delivered in May 1932.

In 1932, after evaluation of the Š-228-5, Finland agreed to purchase a further modified version, powered by a 580 hp (430 kW) Bristol Pegasus engine to serve as a long-range reconnaissance aircraft and a day and night bomber. A single prototype of the new version, the Š-328F, was to be handed over to the Finns by 15 May 1933, to be followed by 11 production aircraft built by Letov, with 35 more to be built under license by the Finns. Part payment for the aircraft would be in Finnish goods, including plywood and gunpowder. The prototype did not make its first flight until 19 June 1933, and required modification before handover, while the Czechoslovak Ministry of Defence had no interest in Finnish gunpowder. Letov tried to renegotiate the delivery terms, but Jarl Lundqvist, the commander of the Finnish Air Force, cancelled the order, instead choosing to buy from the Dutch company Fokker.

The type began equipping the Czechoslovak Air Force in 1935. The machine was made in two versions—with wheeled undercarriage for land use and with floats for water operations. Although Czechoslovakia was a land-locked nation, a floatplane target tug was necessary for a Czechoslovak anti-aircraft artillery training depot in the Bay of Kotor (now in Montenegro) and four were built as the Š-328v (v stood for vodní or water). It was used as a reconnaissance aircraft, light bomber and ground-attack aircraft for the Czechoslovakia Air Force during the mid- and late-1930s and in that same role during the early months of World War II, when the Slovak Air Force came under German control following its occupation of Czechoslovakia in March 1939. 13 planes from first production batch were tested as night fighters, armed with four 7,92 mm vz.30 machine guns in the wings and two movable vz.30s for the observer. These were later modified for normal use because without radar whose effectiveness was minimal. At the time of the Munich Agreement, which ended the Sudeten crisis the Czechoslovak Air Force had 227 planes in operational units and 87 in training schools and mobilisation depots. Production continued even after German occupation of Czechoslovakia until 1940, the last planes being 30 Š-328 produced for Bulgaria, and 50 planes of that type ordered by Slovakia in July 1938. Altogether, 412 Letov Š-328 were produced.

The Letov Š-328's combat record is vague but some sources suggest that some Š-328 landplanes may have been used during the Spanish Civil War however there is no evidence to confirm this and is likely a misidentification of another type (probably Letov Š-231 of which 17 units were in service of the Republican air force). The Germans used captured Š-328s both as trainers and in the night attack role on the Eastern Front in the Winter of 1942–43. The Germans handed over some of these machines to their allies, Bulgaria, and Slovakia.

In early October 1939, Š-328s of the Second Czechoslovak Republic were used to attack Hungarian forces that had crossed into Ruthenia. Although the incursion was defeated, Czechoslovakia was forced to hand over much of Ruthenia to Hungary in the First Vienna Award. In March 1939, Germany occupied the remaining Czech part of Czechoslovakia, with Slovakia declaring independence. On 23 March 1939, Hungary invaded Slovakia, and in the brief Slovak–Hungarian War, Slovak Š-328s were used for reconnaissance and attack duties against the advancing Hungarian forces.

The Slovak Š-328s carried out reconnaissance and bombing sorties in support of the Slovak participation in the Invasion of Poland in September 1939. Following Slovakia's participation in the German Invasion of the Soviet Union in 1941, Slovak Š-328s were used for patrol and reconnaissance flights and a few of them also attacked soviet trucks and cars. They were again used in anti-partisan operations in western Ukraine in the summer of 1942. At least 11 Slovak aircraft were seized by Slovak insurgents and flown against the Germans in late 1944 during the Slovak National Uprising in September to October 1944. The unit never had more than three aircraft operational at time, but they were an important asset. On 7 September 1944, this aircraft achieved one of the last downings of an enemy aircraft achieved by a biplane, when a patrolling Š-328 was attacked by a reconnaissance Focke-Wulf Fw 189. The Fw 189 was damaged by machine gun fire and forced to land in an area controlled by the insurgents.

== Operators ==
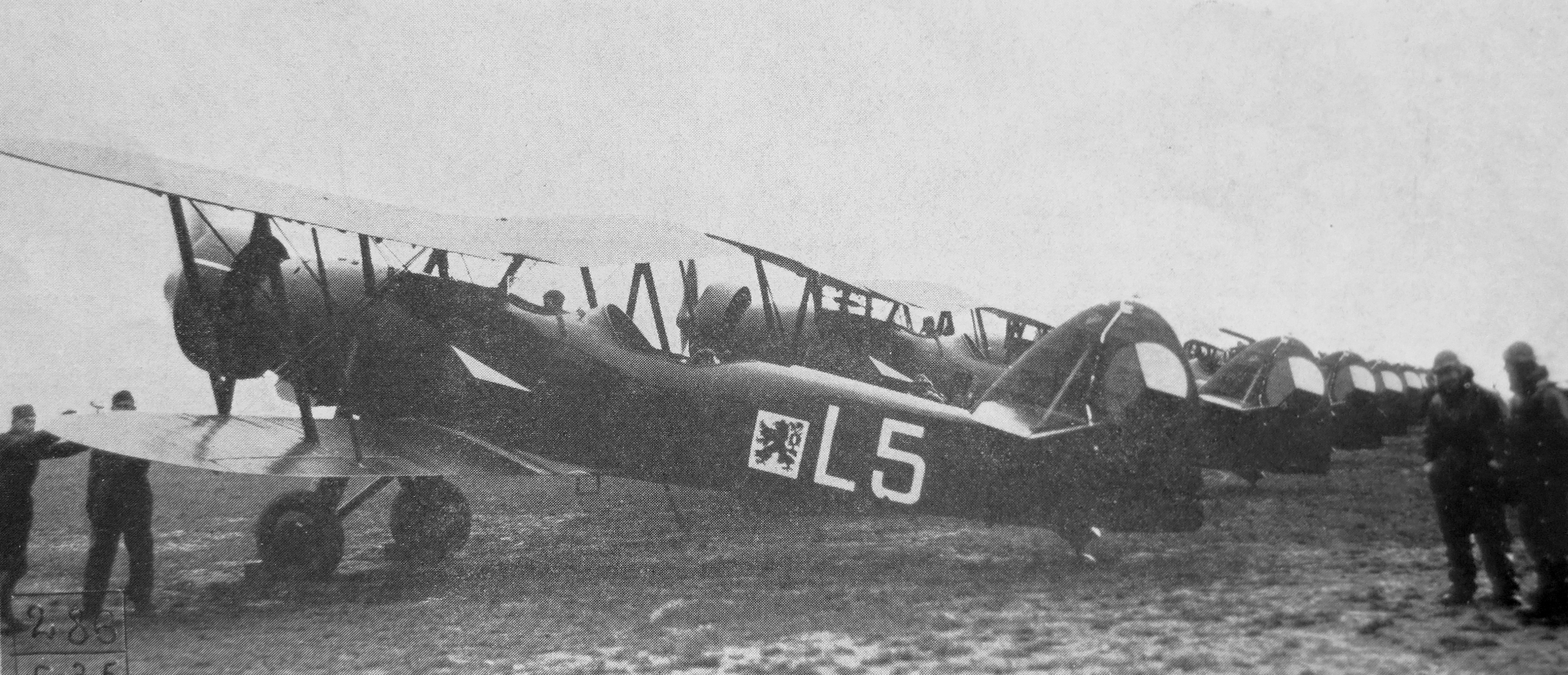
Letov Š-328

Bulgaria

- Bulgarian Air Force purchased 62 Š-328s from Germany in 1939, naming them the Vrana (Crow), of which 30 were produced after German occupation of Czechoslovakia. Till 1942 they were also used for anti-submarine patrols over the Black Sea. They remained in service until at least September 1944.

Czechoslovakia

- Czechoslovak Air Force
- Czechoslovak National Security Guard

Estonia

- Estonian Air Force

Germany

- Luftwaffe

Romania

- Royal Romanian Air Force - one Š-328 escorting train with refugees landed in Romania following the Slovak–Hungarian War. It was used for training until 1941 when it was retired following an accident.

Slovak Republic (1939 - 1945)

- Slovak Air Force
- Slovak Insurgent Air Force

== Variants ==
- Š-28 - prototype with Walter Castor engine (one built)
- Š-128 - production version with Gnome et Rhône-built Bristol Mercury VII engine (12 built)
- Š-228 - production version for Estonia with Walter-built Bristol Mercury VII (four built)
  - Š-328F - prototype for Finland, powered by 580 hp (433 kW) Bristol Pegasus IIM-2 radial engine (1 built).
- Š-328 - main production version. Approx 412 built in total, including:
  - Š-328N- night fighter, armed with four forward-firing and two flexibly mounted machine guns.
  - Š-328V - floatplane target tug (four built)
- Š-428 - close ground support aircraft covering armies on the battlefield. The engine was an Avia VR-36 545 kW, V-12 liquid-cooled inline piston engine of 740 hp (one built)
- Š-528 - planned replacement for Š-328 developed in 1935, powered by 800 hp (597 kW) Gnome-Rhône Mistral Major (six built).

== Specifications (Š-328) ==
Data from Tschechoslowakische Flugzeuge : von 1918 bis heute, and Jane's All the World's Aircraft 1934

General characteristics

- Crew: 2
- Length: 10.36 m (34 ft 0 in)
- Wingspan: 13.71 m (45 ft 0 in)
- Height: 3.34 m (10 ft 11 in)
- Wing area: 39.4 m^{2} (424 sq ft) (20.4 m^{2} (219.6 sq ft) top wing, 19 m^{2} (204.5 sq ft) lower wing
- Empty weight: 1,680 kg (3,704 lb)
- Gross weight: 2,640 kg (5,820 lb)
- Fuel capacity: 320 L (85 US gal; 70 imp gal) in main fuselage tank + 280 L (74 US gal; 62 imp gal) in two upper wing gravity tanks
- Powerplant: 1 × Walter Pegasus II-M.2 9-cylinder air-cooled radial piston engine, 420–430 kW (560–580 hp) at 5,000 m (16,000 ft)
- Propellers: 2-bladed fixed-pitch wooden propeller

Performance

- Maximum speed: 280 km/h (170 mph, 150 kn) at 1,800 m (5,900 ft)

255 km/h (158 mph; 138 kn) at 5,000 m (16,000 ft)

- Cruise speed: 250 km/h (160 mph, 130 kn)
- Range: 700 km (430 mi, 380 nmi)
- Service ceiling: 7,200 m (23,600 ft)
- Time to altitude: 5,000 m (16,000 ft) in 17 minutes
- Wing loading: 67.1 kg/m^{2} (13.7 lb/sq ft)
- Power/mass: 0.016 kW/kg (0.01 hp/lb)

Armament

- Guns:

- 2x or 4x fixed forward-firing 7.92 mm (0.312 in) belt-fed vz.30 machine guns in upper and/or lower wing (400 rpg) (lower wing only for 2-gun fit)
- 2× 7.92 mm (0.312 in) drum-fed vz.30 machine guns in flexible "Skoda" mount in rear cockpit (420 rpg in 6 drums)

- Bombs:

- 500 kg (1,102 lb) of bombs. 5 x 100 kg bombs (4 in pairs under the wing, 1 under the fuselage). Usually 6 x 20 kg bombs under wing and 2 x 50 kg under the fuselage.

== See also ==
Related lists

- List of Interwar military aircraft

== Bibliography ==
- Gerdessen, Frederik. "Estonian Air Power 1918 – 1945". Air Enthusiast, No. 18, April – July 1982. pp. 61–76. ISSN 0143-5450.
- Green, William (1967). War Planes of the Second World War, Volume 7, Bombers (1st ed.). London: Macdonald & Co.
- Green, William; Swanborough, Gordon (May–August 1989). "Balkan Interlude - The Bulgarian Air Force in WWII". Air Enthusiast. No. 39. Bromley, Kent: Tri-Service Press. pp. 58–74. ISSN 0143-5450.
- Krumbach, Jan; Vraný, Jiří (1984). "Monografie: Letov Š-328: Část I". Letectví + Kosmonautka (in Czech). Vol. LX, no. 20. pp. 790–792.
- Krumbach, Jan; Vraný, Jiří (1984). "Monografie: Letov Š-328: Část II". Letectví + Kosmonautka (in Czech). Vol. LX, no. 21. pp. 830–832.
- Krumbach, Jan; Vraný, Jiří (1984). "Monografie: Letov Š-328: Část III". Letectví + Kosmonautka (in Czech). Vol. LX, no. 21. pp. 870–872.
- Mondey, David. (1996). The Concise Guide to Axis Aircraft of World War II. London: Chancellor Press. ISBN 1-85152-966-7.
- Rajlich, Jiří; Sehnal, Jiri (1993). Vzduch Je Naše Moře: Československé letectví 1918–1939 (in Czech). Prague: Naše vojsko. ISBN 80-206-0221-6.
- Rajlich, Jiří; Sehnal, Jiri (Winter 1994). "'Tatra Eagles': The Slovak Air Force in Combat, 1942–45". Air Enthusiast. No. 56. pp. 63–68. ISSN 0143-5450.
- Rajninec, Juraj; Sanders, James V. (September 1971). "Conflict over the Carpathians". Air Enthusiast. Vol. 1, no. 4. pp. 180–183. ISBN 0-385-08171-5.
- Sinnhuber, Karl (2012). Salzburg To Stalingrad. UK: Milton Keynes. ISBN 978-1-471-70222-8.
- Vraný, Jiří; Hurt, Zdeněk; Hornát, Jiří; Skala, Skala (1991). Ilustrovaná Historie Levtectví: Bristol Beaufighter, Mikojan-Gurjevič MiG-19, Letov Š-328 (in Czech). Prague: Naše vojsko. ISBN 80-206-0203-8.
