= OA vz. 30 =

Czechoslovak armoured car

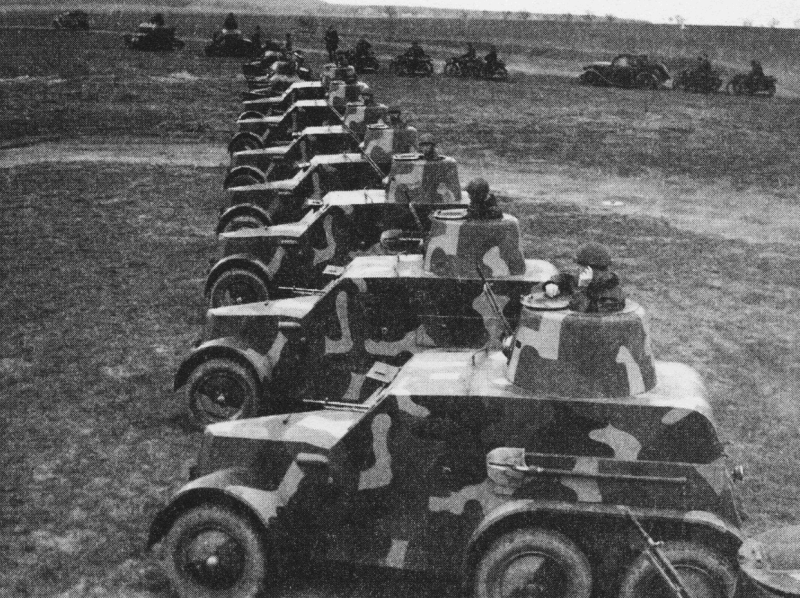
- Type: Armored car
- Place of origin: Czechoslovakia

Service history
- In service: 1934−44
- Used by: See users
- Wars: World War II

Production history
- Designer: Tatra
- Designed: 1930−33
- Manufacturer: Tatra
- Produced: 1933−34
- No. built: 51 + 1 prototype

Specifications
- Mass: 2.78 tonnes (2.74 long tons; 3.06 short tons)
- Length: 4.02 metres (13.2 ft)
- Width: 1.52 metres (5.0 ft)
- Height: 2.02 metres (6.6 ft)
- Crew: 3
- Armor: 3–6 millimetres (0.12–0.24 in)
- Main armament: 2 x 7.92 mm (0.312 in) ZB vz. 26 machine guns
- Engine: 4-cylinder, air-cooled Tatra 71; 32 horsepower (24 kW)
- Suspension: 6x4
- Operational range: 300 kilometres (190 mi)
- Maximum speed: 60 kilometres per hour (37 mph)

The OA vz. 30 (full name Obrněný automobil vzor 30, English: Armoured Car Type 30) was a Czechoslovak-designed armored car used by Czechoslovakia in the 1930s and by Nazi Germany, Slovakia, Romania and Hungary during World War II. Fifty-one were built, of which the Germans seized twenty-four when they occupied Bohemia-Moravia in March 1939 and the Slovaks captured eighteen when they declared independence from Czechoslovakia at the same time. Romania acquired nine when Czech troops sought refuge in Romania after the Hungarian invasion of Carpatho-Ukraine that same month. Slovak vehicles saw combat in the Slovak-Hungarian War, the invasion of Poland, the opening months of Operation Barbarossa and the Slovak National Uprising.

== Description ==
The OA vz. 30's armored body was mounted on a Tatra 6 × 4 T-72 truck chassis. The chassis design was unusual as it was a central tube design with independently sprung rear half-axles which gave good cross-country performance. The driver sat on the right side using an observation port protected by an armored shutter with a vision slit. The assistant driver sat on the left and had a small vision port for his ZB vz. 26 light machine gun. It was mounted in a firing slit directly to his front. There were similar vision ports on both sides. The crew accessed the fighting compartment from a door in the rear of the vehicle. The gunner sat in a small, cylindrical turret with 360° of traverse. It had an observation port in the front and vision slits on both sides and the rear. The turret had another ZB vz. 26 in a ball mount. Another machine gun was carried inside the vehicle, as were 3,000 rounds for the machine guns. The armor ranged between 3 and 6 mm (0.12 and 0.24 in) thick; this was deemed enough to deflect ordinary bullets fired from over 100 metres (110 yd) distance.

The 1.91-litre (117 cu in), air-cooled, 32-horsepower (24 kW), four-cylinder boxer Tatra 71 engine was mounted in the front. It gave a top speed of 60 kilometres per hour (37 mph). The vehicle could cross a ditch .5 metres (1.6 ft) wide, climb an obstacle .28 metres (0.92 ft) high and ford a stream .3 metres (0.98 ft) deep.

== Development ==
The development history for the OA vz. 30 is difficult to chart, but the Czech Army had been evaluating various Tatra truck chassis for use as armored cars since 1926 with a number of prototypes built over the years with both wooden and metal bodies to test vehicle layouts. An order was finally placed on 6 March 1933 for fifty-one for delivery in December. Tatra was late and only delivered the first six on 29 January 1934 followed by sixteen more in February and the rest in July because their garages in Milovice were not yet complete.

== Operational history ==
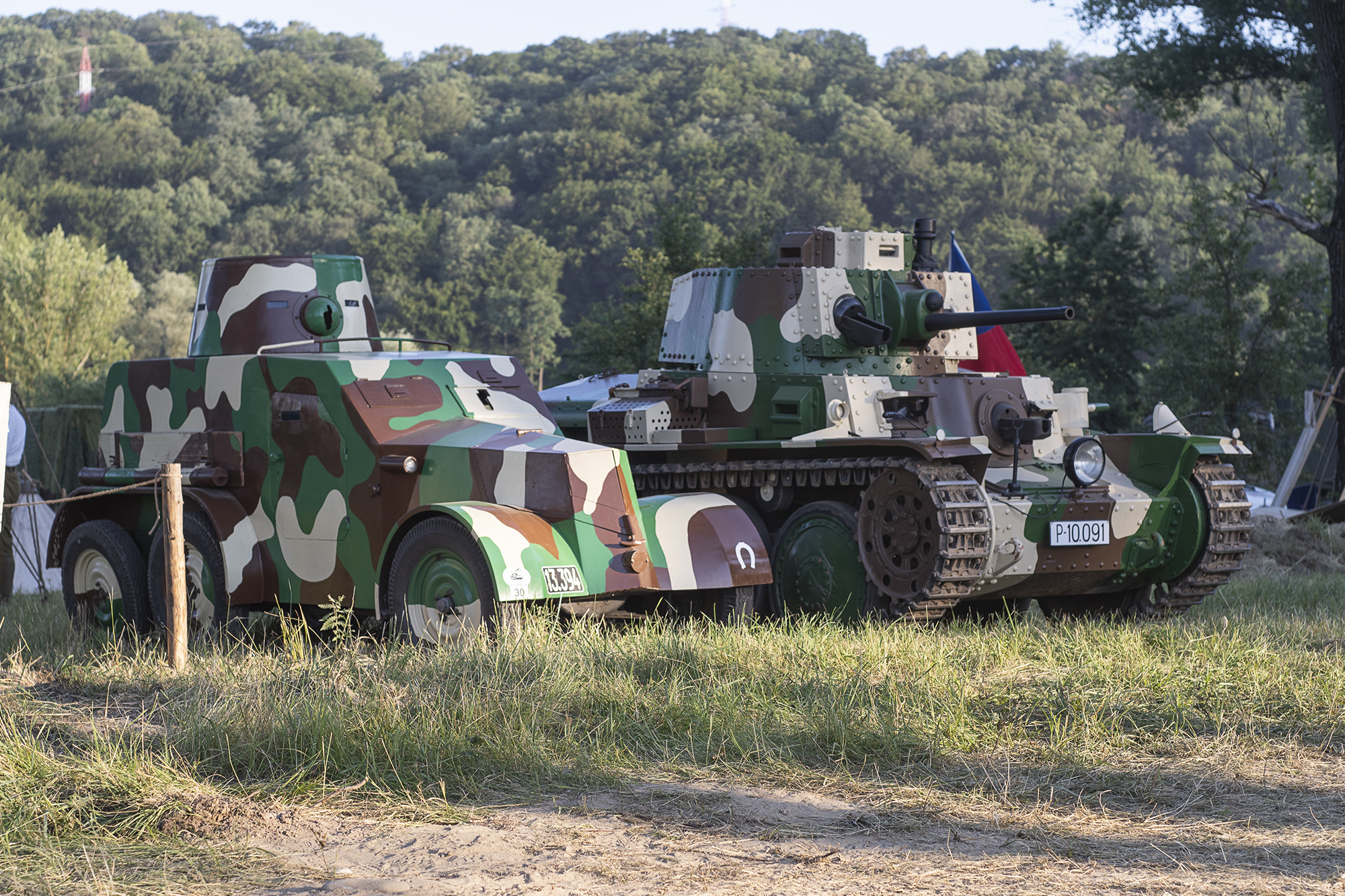
Replica of OA vz. 30

=== Czechoslovakia ===
In service they proved to have some serious shortcomings. The engines were weak and did not allow the vehicle to fully exploit the abilities of the chassis, not even being able to cross the ditches at the sides of roads. The armor was thin and could be penetrated at close range by rifles and the ZB vz. 26 machine guns were not capable of sustained fire.

The Army decided to organize them in three-vehicle platoons assigned to the reconnaissance companies of the four Mobile (Rychlá) Divisions and assigned the extra platoons to support the border areas. These platoons were heavily used in suppressing the protests and violence instigated by Konrad Henlein's Sudeten German Party (Sudetendeutsche Partei - SdP) and the Sudetendeutsche Freikorps (paramilitary groups trained in Germany by SS-instructors) between May and October 1938. After the Munich Agreement, two companies of OA vz. 30s were sent to reinforce Slovakia and Ruthenia where they were used to repel Hungarian and Polish border-crossers, sometimes up to a battalion in strength. They helped to screen the infantry when they had to evacuate southern Slovakia after the First Vienna Award on 2 November 1938. Ten armored cars, no longer needed once that the border areas had been annexed by Germany and Hungary, were sold to the Gendarmerie in February-March 1939. Two companies defended Carpatho-Ukraine in March 1939 from a Hungarian attack, but were forced to seek refuge in Slovakia and Romania. One OA vz. 30 was captured by the Hungarians during the fighting, but they made no known use of it.

=== Germany ===
The Germans captured one OA vz. 30 in October 1938 that was being repaired in the Sudetenland when they occupied that area. Another twenty-three, including the prototype, were seized in March 1939 when they occupied Bohemia-Moravia. Seven were used by the propaganda companies as radio cars. Ten were taken over by the Uniformed Police (Ordnungspolizei) and three equipped a platoon of the 14th Armored Police Company (Polizei-Panzer-Kompanie) in Slovenia in January 1944.

=== Slovakia ===
The three OA vz.30 armored cars of the Slovak Mobile group in Diakivtsi, Ukraine, July 7th-9th of 1941

Ten armored cars were seized by the Slovaks when they declared independence in March 1939, and eight additional OA vz. 30s fell into their hands from Czech troops who sought refuge in Slovakia after fighting the Hungarians in Carpatho-Ukraine. One was destroyed during the Slovak-Hungarian War that began a week later. The seventeen surviving OA vz. 30s formed one company in the Armored Battalion "Martin" formed by the Slovak Army in mid-1939, but that was reduced to a platoon by late 1939. Four armored cars reinforced the 2nd Infantry Division during the invasion of Poland and three others reinforced a cavalry reconnaissance unit in the vicinity of Sanok. A company of six OA vz. 30s was part of Mobile Group Kalinčiak that was formed on 5 September to work with the 2nd Infantry Division, but saw no combat before being withdrawn back to Slovakia on the 21st.

A platoon of three was assigned to the Mobile Group that joined the Germans in Operation Barbarossa on 24 June 1941. Two more were added when the Mobile Group was reinforced and redesignated as the Mobile Brigade on 8 July. The only serious combat encountered by the Slovak armor was at Lipovec in late July where they failed to dislodge the Soviet 44th Mountain Rifle Division from its positions. One OA vz. 30 was destroyed during this battle and two others were heavily damaged. All of the armored cars were withdrawn together with all the other armored vehicles and returned to Slovakia in early August. A company of six OA vz. 30s was sent to reinforce the Security Division on anti-partisan duties in Ukraine in August 1942. Two were destroyed in combat and there was only one running when the survivors were withdrawn back to Slovakia on 12 January 1943. Once the Panzerkampfwagen IIs that the Ministry of Defense had ordered to replace them arrived in January 1944 they were put into storage although they were still carried on the books. They saw some use by the insurgents when the Slovak National Uprising began in September 1944, but little is known of their activities.

=== Romania ===
Almost nothing is known about the career of the OA vz. 30 in Romania after one Czech company of ten sought refuge there in March 1939. One unconfirmed report says that some were on the strength of the Romanian dictator Antonescu's bodyguard unit (Batalionul de gardă al mareşalului Antonescu or Regimentul de gardă al Conducătorului Statului). Supposedly three were destroyed during American bombing of Ploieşti in the summer of 1944 while being serviced at the depot there.

== Users ==
- Czechoslovakia
- Nazi Germany
- Romania
- Slovakia
