= Alexander Petrunkevitch =

American entomologist

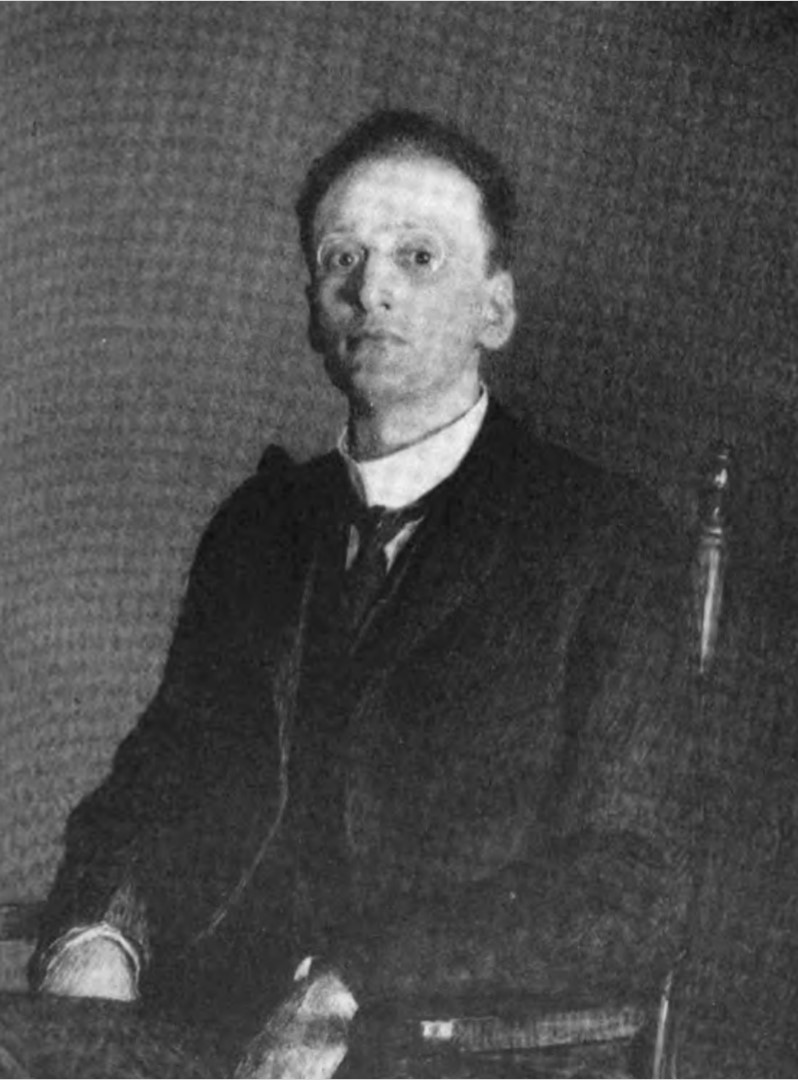
- Born: 22 December 1875; Plysky, Russian Empire
- Died: 9 March 1964 (aged 88); New Haven, Connecticut, U.S.
- Known for: Description of over 130 spider species
- Scientific career
- Fields: Arachnology, biology

Alexander Ivanovitch Petrunkevitch (Russian: Александр Иванович Петрункевич; December 22, 1875 – March 9, 1964) was a Russian arachnologist. From 1910 to 1939, he described over 130 spider species. One of his most famous essays was "The Spider and the Wasp." In it he uses effective word choices and some comic touch.

== Biography ==
His aristocratic father, Ivan Illitch Petrunkevitch, was a liberal member of the First Duma and founded the Constitutional Democratic Party. After finishing his studies in Moscow and in Freiburg under August Weismann, Alexander settled in Yale in 1910, becoming a full professor in 1917. Apart from describing present-day species, he was a major figure in the study of fossil arachnids, including those in amber and from the Coal Measures. He also experimented with live specimens and worked on insects.

Petrunkevitch's formulation of the principle of plural effects (every cause is potentially capable of producing several effects) and the principle of the limits of possible oscillations (the number and the nature of the effects which actually take place may vary within definite limitations only) is well known, both in biology and psychology.

Petrunkevitch was elected to the National Academy of Sciences in 1954 and was also a member of the Connecticut Academy of Arts and Sciences. Throughout his career he remained politically active, trying to increase awareness of problems in Russia. He was a founder, and later president, of the Federation of Russian Organizations in the United States. He was also a skilled machinist and wrote two volumes of poetry (under the pseudonym Alexandr Jan-Ruban), and translated Pushkin into the English language, and Byron into Russian. He died in 1964.

A 1917 portrait miniature of Petrunkevitch by Margaret Foote Hawley is currently owned by the Metropolitan Museum of Art.

== Selected texts authored by Petrunkevitch ==
- The role of the intellectuals in the liberating movement in Russia ("Russian Revolution," Cambridge, Harvard University Press, 1918, pp. 8-21);
- The Russian Revolution (The Yale Alumni Weekly, 1917);
- Russian Revolution (Yale Review, July, 1917);
- The Political Crisis in Russia (Yale Alumni Weekly, Nov. 16, 1917).
- New Erigoninae from Tennessee (Journal of the New York Entomological Society, 1925)
- New Observations on Moulting and Mating in Tarantulæ (Journal of the New York Entomological Society, 1934)
