= Augustín Malár =

Slovak general (1894–1945?)

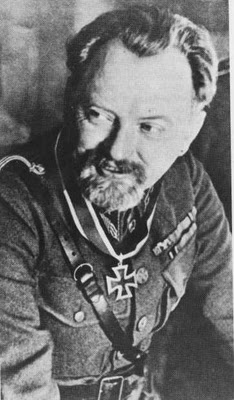
- Born: July 18, 1894; Sankt Oswald bei Freistadt, Austria-Hungary
- Died: February 28, 1945 (aged 50); Sachsenhausen, Germany
- Military career
- Allegiance: Austria-Hungary; Czechoslovakia; Slovakia
- Branch: Austro-Hungarian Army; Czechoslovak Army; Slovak Army
- Service years: 1915–1945
- Rank: General
- Conflicts: World War I World War II
- Awards: Knight's Cross of the Iron Cross

Augustín Malár (18 July 1894 – 28 February 1945) was a Slovak general during World War II.

== Biography ==
During the interwar period, Malár was one of the few successful higher officers of Slovak nationality in the Czechoslovak Army. After the German occupation of Bohemia and Moravia and the establishment of the First Slovak Republic in March 1939, he became one of the highest and most experienced officers in the newly created Slovak Army. After the Slovak puppet state declared war on the USSR, the so-called Fast Division or Slovak Motorized Division was deployed on the Eastern Front. Malár became commander of the unit at the turn of 1941 and 1942. During this time he earned promotion to general and received the German Knight's Cross of the Iron Cross.

Later he served as military attaché to Italy and Germany, and in 1944 he was appointed as a commander of the East Slovak Army, the two best Slovak divisions which were intended to defend Slovakia against Soviet offensives. The planners of the 1944 insurrection against Nazi rule, the Slovak National Council, assumed that Malár, as a Slavophile and experienced field commander, would contribute his East Slovak units in the uprising and link up with the Soviets to allow the Red Army to pass through Slovak territory without a fight.

However, after the poorly timed start of the uprising on 29 August 1944, contrary to expectations, Malár did not join the rebels. In a radio speech the next day, he opposed the uprising and exhorted soldiers to return to their barracks as "our time has not come yet." As a military strategist, he wanted the uprising to end successfully.

Because of his statements about fighting against the Germans in the future, German security authorities arrested him when he returned to Prešov in Eastern Slovakia. He was deported to Germany, where he died after interrogation in the Sachsenhausen concentration camp - Zellenbau.
