= List of palatines of Hungary =

This is a list of palatines of Hungary. A palatine (Hungarian: nádorispán or nádor; also: Croatian: ugarski palatin; German: Palatin; Slovak: nádvorný župan or nádvorný špán, later: palatín or nádvorník) was the highest-ranking dignitary in the Kingdom of Hungary after the King of Hungary from the kingdom's rise in the 11th century up to 1848–1918.

== Age of Árpádian kings ==
Name	Date	King	Note
Samuel Aba	1009–1038	Saint Stephen I	king (1041–1044)
Zache	around 1055	Andrew I	mentioned in the founding charter of the abbey of Tihany
Radó	around 1057	Andrew I	
Ottó	around 1066	Solomon	from the kindred of Győr
Radván	around 1067–1071	Solomon	Bogátradvány kindred co-founder; son of Bogát; descendant of Hont-Pázmány kindred
Gyula	1075–1091 (?)	Géza I, Saint Ladislaus (?)	
Péter	1091	Saint Ladislaus	
János	1108–1113	Coloman	son of Uros
Fancsal	1131(?)–1138	Béla II	son of Bozeta
Beloš	1146–1157	Géza II	brother of Helena of Rascia; uncle of Géza II
Henrik	1162–1164	Stephen III	from the kindred of Héder
Tamás	1163	Stephen IV	in rebellion
Ampud	1165–1174	Stephen III, Béla III	
Farkas	1177(?)–1183	Béla III	from the kindred of Gatal
Dénes	1184	Béla III	
Tamás	1185–1186	Béla III	
Mog	1192–1193, 1198–1199, 1206	Béla III, Emeric, Andrew II	
Ézsau	1197–1198	Emeric	
Mika	1199–1201	Emeric	from the kindred of Ják
Benedek	1202–1204	Emeric	
Miklós	1205, 1213–1214	Ladislaus III	
Csépán	1206–1209	Andrew II	from the kindred of Győr
Poth	1209–1212	Andrew II	from the kindred of Győr
Bánk	1212–1213	Andrew II	from the kindred of Bór-Kalán
Miklós	1219–1222, 1226	Andrew II	from the kindred of Szák
Gyula	1215–1217, 1222–1226	Andrew II	from the kindred of Kán
Tódor	1222	Andrew II	from the kindred of Csanád
Dénes	1227–1229, 1231–1234	Andrew II	son of Ampod
Mojs	1229–1230	Andrew II	son of Ampod
Dénes	1235–1241	Béla IV	from the kindred of Tomaj; died at the Battle of Mohi
Arnold	1242	Béla IV	from the kindred of Buzád-Hahót
László	1242–1245	Béla IV	from the kindred of Kán
Dénes	1245–1246, 1248	Béla IV	from the kindred of Türje
István	1246–1248	Béla IV	from the kindred of Gutkeled; Duke of Slavonia (1248–1259)
Lóránd	1248–1261, 1272–1273, 1274–1275	Béla IV, Stephen IV, Ladislaus IV	from the kindred of Rátót
Kőszegi Henrik	1261–1267	Béla IV	from the kindred of Héder
Dénes	1263, 1273–1274, 1277–1278	Béla IV, Ladislaus IV	from the kindred of Pécz; palatine of Stephen V, the "younger king" (1263)
Domonkos	1266	Béla IV	from the kindred of Csák, palatine of Stephen V, the "younger king"
Benedek	1268	Béla IV	son of Tombold, palatine of Stephen V, the "younger king"
Lőrinc	1267–1270, 1272, 1273	Béla IV, Stephen V, Ladislaus IV	son of Kemény
Mojs	1270–1272	Stephen V	brothers-in-law
Miklós Kőszegi	1275, 1276–1277, 1284–1286, 1289–1290, 1291, 1293–1295	Ladislaus IV, Andrew III	from the kindred of Héder, "Transdanubian palatine" (1289–1290)
Péter	1275–1276, 1277, 1278	Ladislaus IV	from the kindred of Csák
Máté	1278–1280, 1282–1283	Ladislaus IV	from the kindred of Csák
Finta	1280–1281	Ladislaus IV	from the kindred of Aba
Iván Kőszegi	1281–1282, 1287–1288	Ladislaus IV	from the kindred of Héder
Makján	1286–1287	Ladislaus IV	from the kindred of Aba
Amadé	1288–1289, 1290–1291, 1293, 1295–1296, 1297–1298, 1299–1301	Ladislaus IV, Andrew III	from the kindred of Aba
Rénold	1289–1290	Ladislaus IV	from the kindred of Basztély, "Cisdanubian palatine"
Mizse	1290	Ladislaus IV	"Cisdanubian palatine"
Mihály	1291–1292	Andrew III	from the kindred of Szente-Mágócs
Máté	1296–1297	Andrew III	from the kindred of Csák
Apor	1298–1299	Andrew III	from the kindred of Pécz; "Transdanubian palatine"
Lóránd	1298–1299	Andrew III	from the kindred of Rátót; "Cisdanubian palatine"

== 1301–1310 ==
Name	Date	King	Note
Máté	1301–1310	Wenceslaus of Bohemia, Otto of Bavaria, Charles Robert I	from the kindred of Csák
Kőszegi Iván	1301–1308	Wenceslaus of Bohemia, Otto of Bavaria, Charles Robert I	from the kindred of Aba
Amadé	1303–1310	Wenceslaus of Bohemia, Otto of Bavaria, Charles Robert I	from the kindred of Aba
István	1303–1307	Wenceslaus of Bohemia, Otto of Bavaria	from the kindred of Ákos
Lóránd	1303–1307	Wenceslaus of Bohemia, Otto of Bavaria	from the kindred of Rátót
Apor	1304–1307	Wenceslaus of Bohemia	from the kindred of Pécz
James Borsa	1306–1310	Otto of Bavaria, Charles Robert I	from the kindred of Borsa

== Anjou Age ==
Name	Date	King	Note
Kopasz Jakab	1310–1314	Charles Robert I	from the kindred of Borsa
Domonkos	1314–1320	Charles Robert I	from the kindred of Rátót; ancestor of the Pásztói family
Dózsa Debreceni	1322	Charles Robert I	
Fülöp Drugeth	1322–1327	Charles Robert I	Drugeth family
János Drugeth	1328–1333	Charles Robert I	brother of Fülöp Drugeth
Vilmos Drugeth	1333–1342	Charles Robert I	son of János Drugeth
Miklós Zsámboki	1342–1356	Louis I the Great	Gilétfi
Miklós Kont	1356–1367	Louis I the Great	ancestor of the House of Ilok
László Oppelni	1367–1372	Louis I the Great	Duke of Opole
Imre I Lackfi	1372–1375	Louis I the Great	Lackfi de Simontornya
Miklós V Garai	1375–1385	Louis I the Great from 1382: Mary I	Regent of Hungary 1382–85 & March to 25 July 1386.
Miklós VI Szécsi	1385–1386	Mary I	founder of the Felsőlindva branch

== Age of kings of different houses ==
Name	Date	King	Note
István V Lackfi	1387–1392	Mary I	Lackfi de Csáktornya
Leusták Jolsvai	1392–1397	Mary I; Sigismund	from the kindred of Rátót
Detre Bebek	1397–1402	Sigismund	son of György Bebek, king's chamberlain
Miklós VII Garai	1402–1433	Sigismund	son of Miklós V Garai
Máté III Pálóczy	1435–1437	Sigismund	
Lőrinc II Hédervári	1437–1447	Albert; Vladislaus I	
Ladislaus Garai	1447–1458	Ladislaus V	son of Miklós VII Garai
Michael Ország	1458–1484	Matthias Corvinus	
Emeric Zápolya	1486–1487	Matthias Corvinus	
Stephen Zápolya	1492–1499	Vladislaus II	brother of Imre II, father of King John I
Péter III Geréb	1500–1503	Vladislaus II	Vingárti
Imre III Perényi	1504–1519	Vladislaus II; Louis II	prince (1517)
István VII Báthory	1519–1523	Louis II	
István VII Báthory	1524–1525	Louis II	
István VIII Werbőczy	1525–1526	Louis II	
István VII Báthory	1526–1530	János Szapolyai; Ferdinand I	third time; de facto ruler of Hungary (29 August – 10 November 1526)

== Age of Ottoman wars ==
Name	Date	King	Note
János IV Bánffy	1530–1534	John I	Alsólindvai; Palatine for John I Governor; Lodovico Gritti (1530–1534)
none	1530–1554	Ferdinand I (1530–1554); John I, from 1540: John II Sigismund Zápolya (1534–1554)	Ferdinand I: Royal Governors; Elek Thurzó (1532–1542); Pál Várdai (1542–1549); Ferenc Újlaky (1550–1554); Palatinal Governor (judicial function); Ferenc Révay (1542–1553)
Tamás III Nádasdy	1554–1562	John II Sigismund Zápolya, until 1556–59: Queen Isabella; Ferdinand I	Palatine and Royal Governor for Ferdinand I
none	1562–1608	Ferdinand I, Holy Roman Emperor, from 1564: Maximilian, from 1576: Rudolf I	Royal Governors; Miklós Oláh (1562–1568); Pál Bornemissza (1568–1572); Antal Verancsics (1572–1573); István Radéczy (1573–1586); György Draskovich (1586–1587); István Fejérkövy (1587–1596); János Kutassy (1597–1601); Márton Pethe (1602–1605); Ferenc Forgách (1607–1608); Palatinal Governors (judicial function); Mihály Mérey (1562–1572); Imre Czobor (1572–1581); Miklós Istvánffy (1582–1608)
István IX Illésházy	1608–1609	Matthias II	
György Thurzó	1609–1616	Matthias II	
Zsigmond Forgách	1618–1621	Matthias II, from 1619: Ferdinand II	
Szaniszló Thurzó	1622–1625	Ferdinand II	
Miklós VIII Esterházy	1625–1645	Ferdinand II, from 1637: Ferdinand III	
János V Draskovich	1646–1648	Ferdinand III	Croatian: Ivan III Drašković
Pál III Pálffy	1649–1654	Ferdinand III	
Ferenc Wesselényi	1655–1667	Ferdinand III, from 1657: Leopold I	
none	1667–1681	Leopold I	Royal Governors; Ferenc Nádasdy (1667–1670); György Szelepcsényi (1670–1681)

== In the Habsburg monarchy ==
Name	Date	King	Note
Pál I Esterházy	1681–1713	Leopold I, from 1705: Joseph I, from 1711: Charles III	
Miklós IX Pálffy	1714–1732	Charles III	
none	1732–1741	Charles III, from 1740: Maria Theresa	Royal Governor; Francis III, Duke of Lorraine
János VI Pálffy	1741–1751	Maria Theresa	
Lajos Batthyány	1751–1765	Maria Theresa	
none	1765–1790	Maria Theresa, from 1780: Joseph II	Royal Governor; Prince Albert of Saxony, Duke of Teschen (1765–1781)
Sándor Lipót	1790–1795	Leopold II, from 1792: Francis I	Habsburg-Lorraine
József	1796–1847	Francis I, from 1835: Ferdinand V	Habsburg-Lorraine
István	1847–1848	Ferdinand V, from 1848: Franz Joseph I	Habsburg-Lorraine
István	de jure 1848–1867	Franz Joseph I	Habsburg-Lorraine
József Károly	de jure 1867–1905	Franz Joseph I	Habsburg-Lorraine
József Ágost	de jure 1905–1918	Franz Joseph I, from 1916: Charles IV	Habsburg-Lorraine

== See also ==
- List of heads of state of Hungary
- Lieutenancy Council
- List of Hungarians
- List of prime ministers of Hungary
- List of rulers of Hungary
