= Saint Nicolas Church, Trnava =

Church in Trnava, Slovakia

Coordinates: 48°22′44″N 17°35′32″E

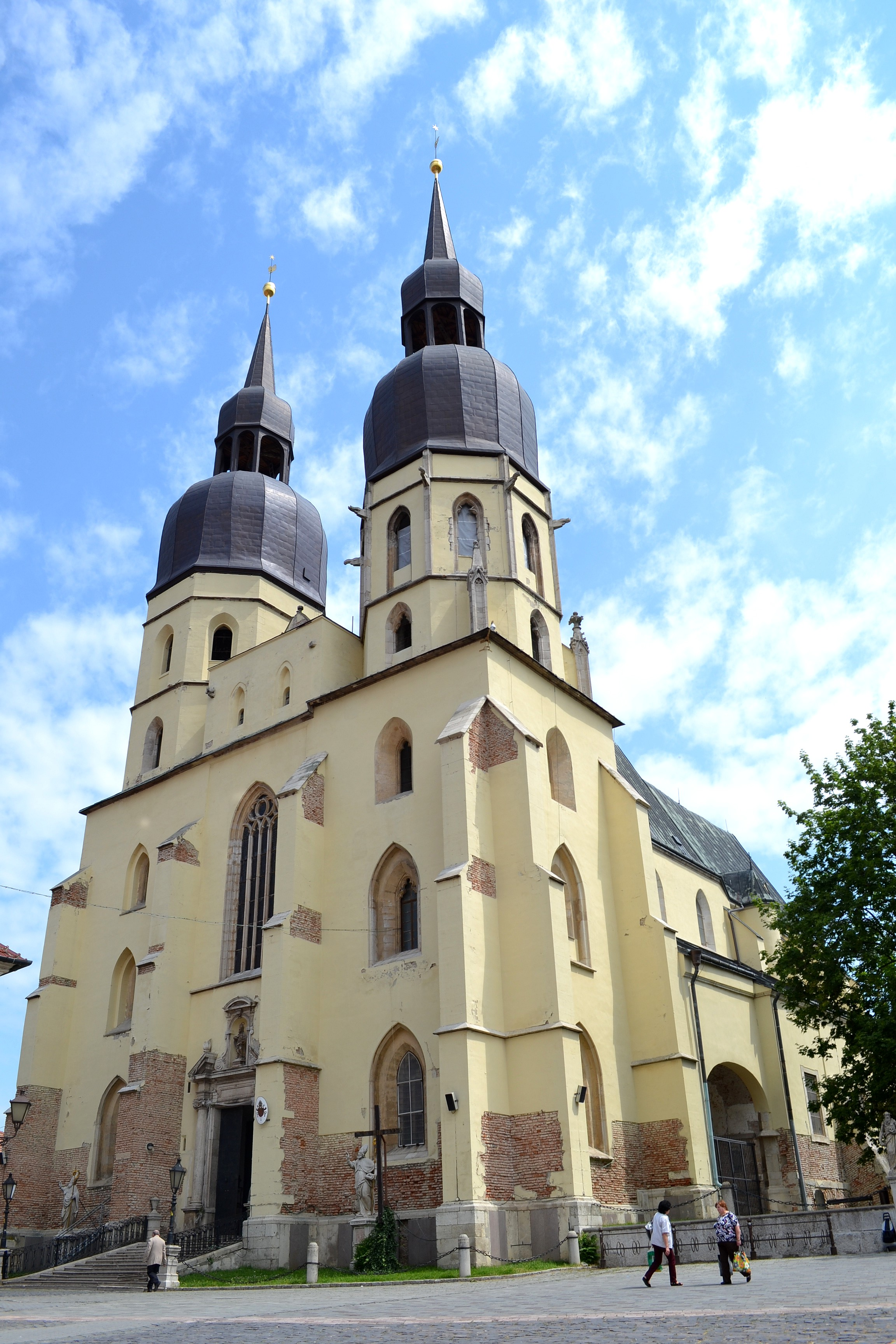

Saint Nicolas Church or Basilica of Saint Nicholas (Slovak: Bazilika Svätého Mikuláša, also known as Hrubý Kostol, meaning "main/big church") is a Gothic/Baroque church in Trnava, Slovakia. In 2009 Pope Benedict XVI granted the parish church of St. Nicolas the honourable title of minor basilica.

== History ==
The church dedicated to Saint Nicolas, patron of merchants, is located at the highest point of the historical town centre, where the former medieval marketplace stood, not far from the city walls. It was built between 1380 and 1421 on the site of an earlier Romanesque church building. When the Ottoman Turks seized Esztergom, the Archbishop relocated to Trnava. From 1543 to 1820, Saint Nicolas was the Archbishop's cathedral.

== Architecture ==
The church is 60m long, 31 m wide, its sanctuary was 17.3m and the nave 18m high. The architecturally homogeneous Gothic basilica type temple, whose nave is nearby twice as high as the aisles, bears marks of the Danube style. The sanctuary of this massive brick structure faces east. Buttresses supporting the high walls alternate with Gothic windows decorated with original stone traceries. The largest Gothic window, adorned with rich traceries and stained glass, is at the church front, and depicts Saint Cecilia. The north tower houses one of the largest bells in Europe.

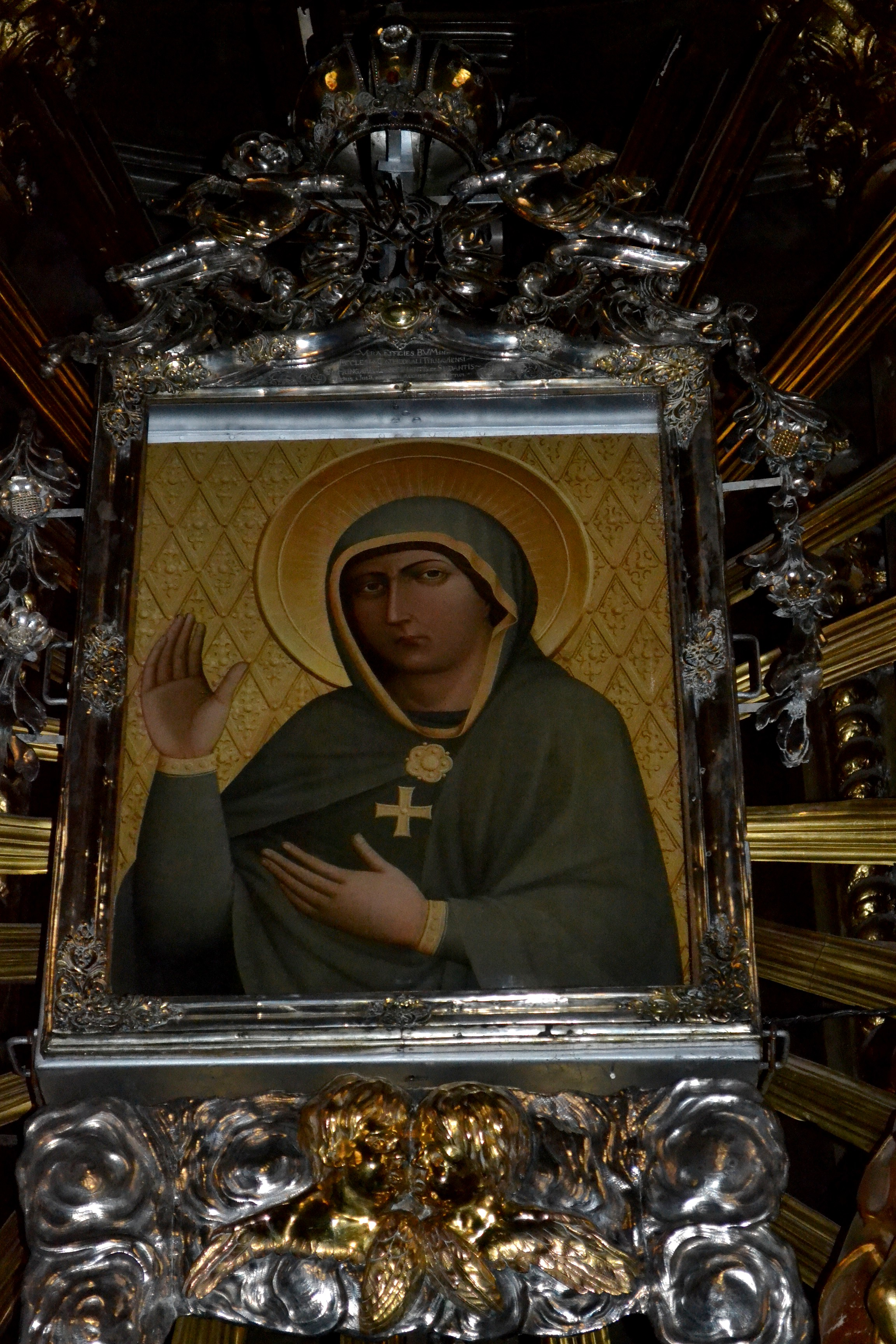

Starting in 1618 Cardinal Peter Pázmány ordered a series of renovations, including its widening and overall reconstruction in the Baroque style. The main altar dedicated to All Saints was created in 1630; several new side altars were also added.

In 1739, Bishop Imrich Esterházy added an octagon chapel to the northern side of the church; it contains the painting known as the "Merciful Virgin Mary of Trnava". It is a Marian pilgrimage site for the archdiocese.

Romanian-Hungarian humanist and scholar Nicolaus Olahus (Nicholas, the Vlach) and Croatian cardinal, diplomat and writer Antun Vrančić are buried in the church.

The Rieger organ dates from 1912. The church hosts an international festival of organ music called Trnavské organové dni, annually every August.

St. Nicolas' Basilica is on the "Cyril and Methodius Route", one of the cultural heritage routes of the Council of Europe.

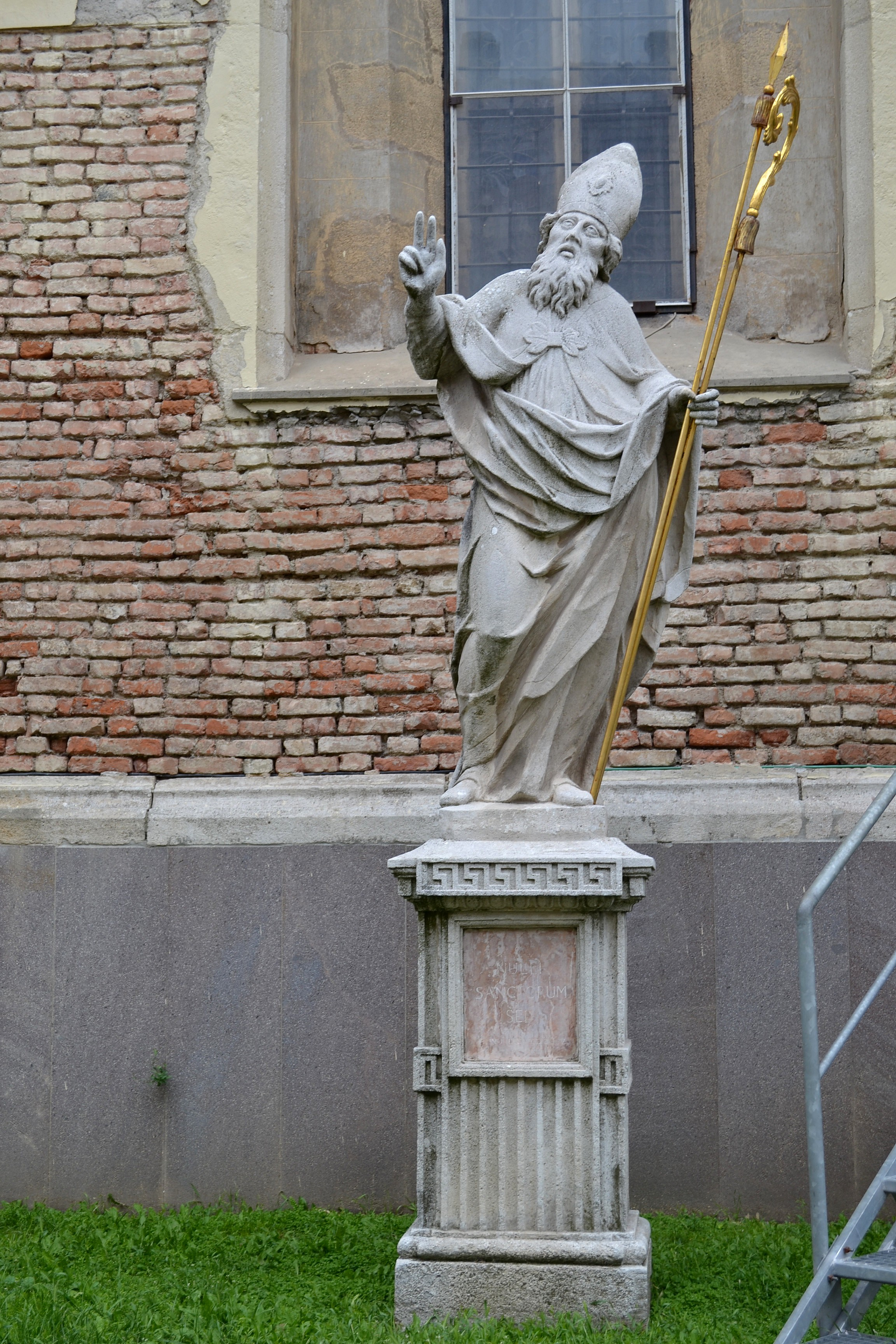
St. Nicolas, Trnava bazilika

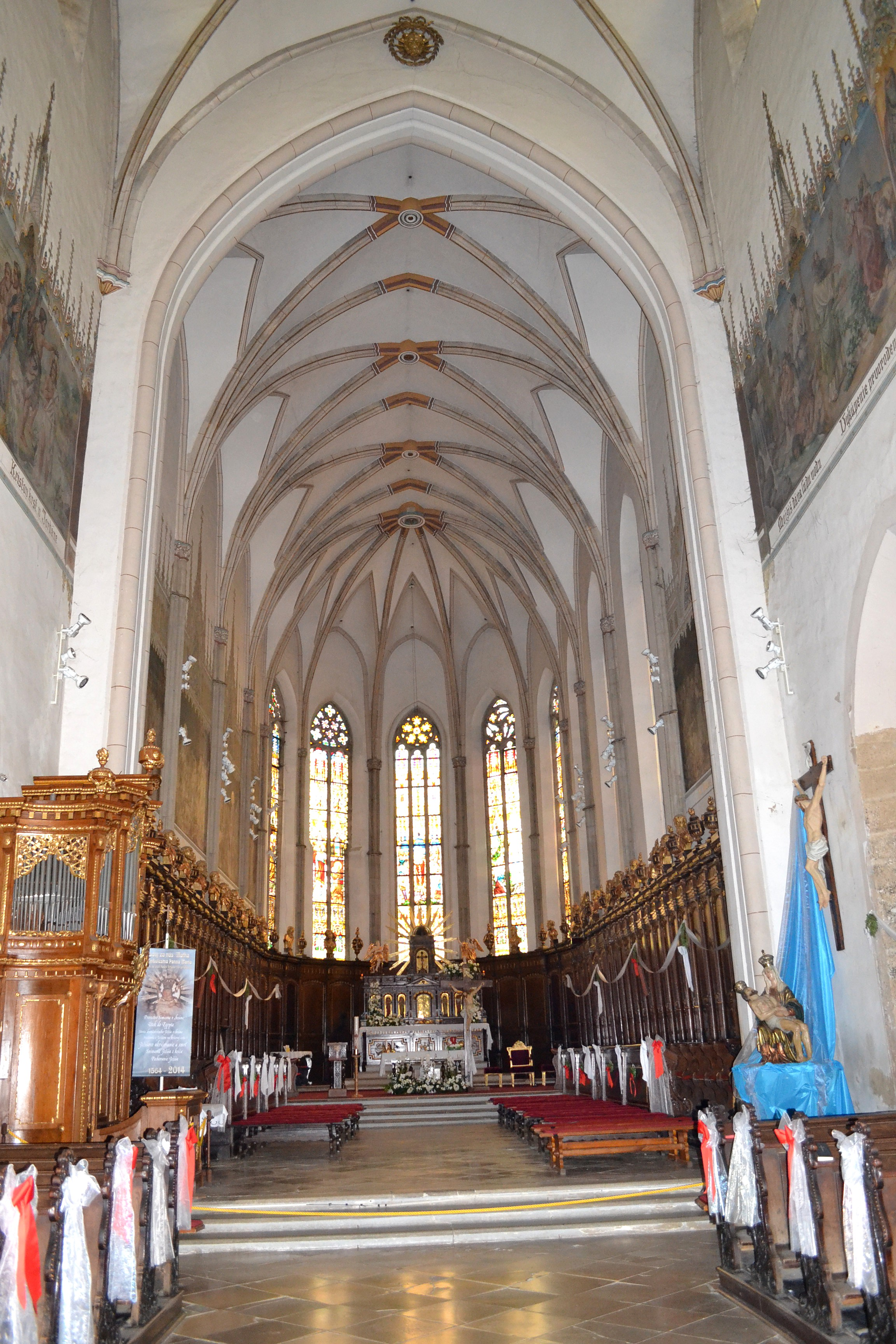
nave

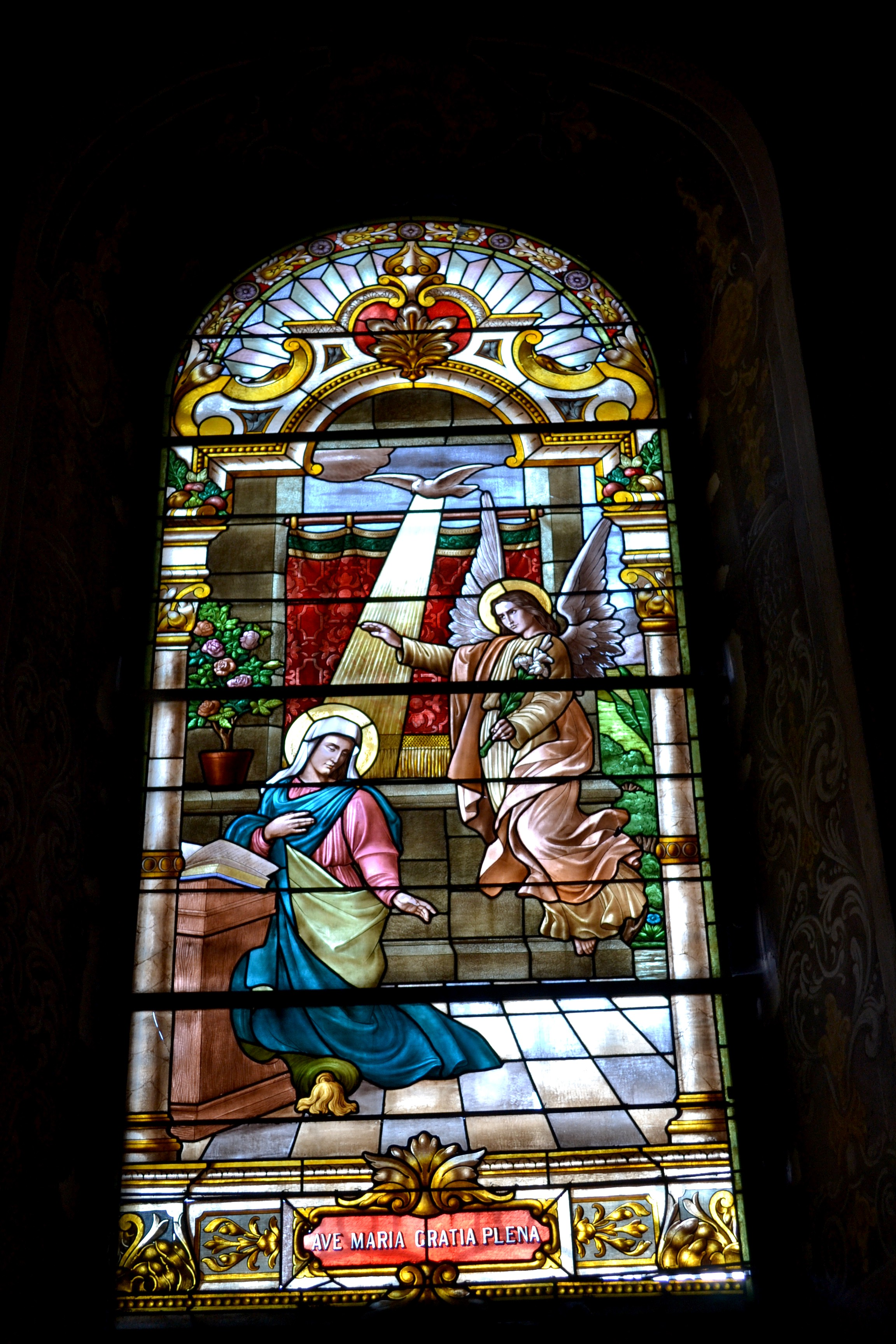
"Annunciation"

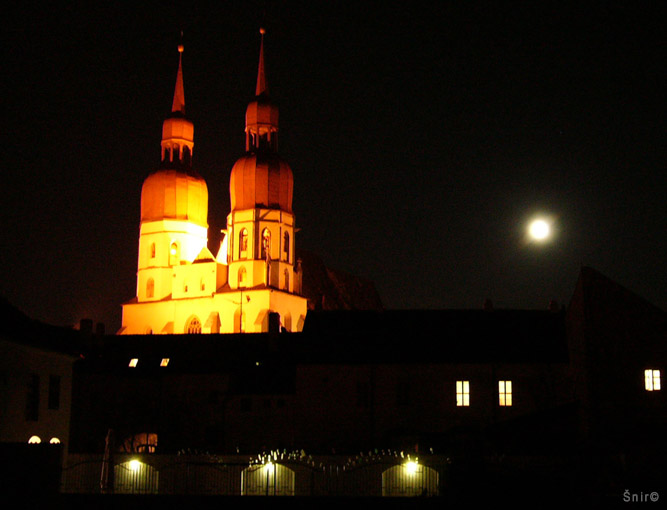
Basilica at night
