= Kaspar Ursinus Velius =

German humanist scholar, poet and historian

Kaspar Ursinus Velius (c. 1493 – 5 March 1539) was a German humanist scholar, poet and historian.

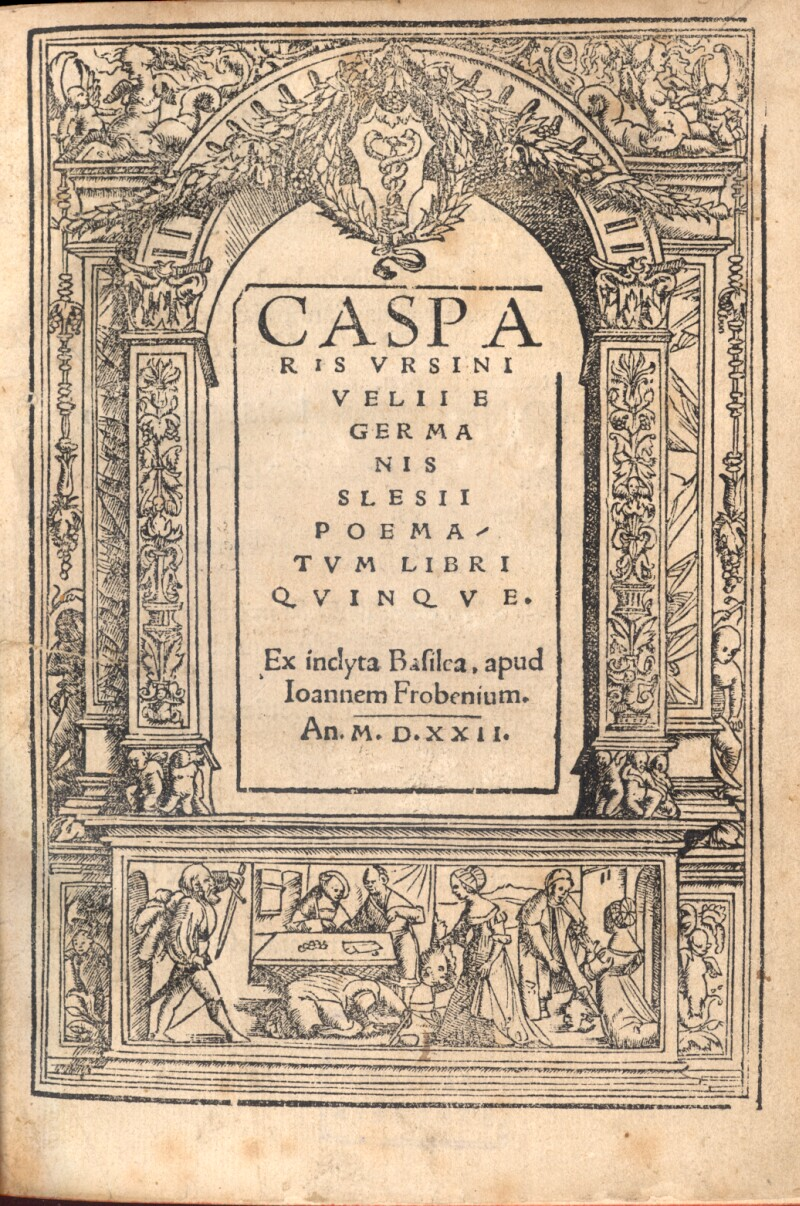
Title page from a book of 1522

== Life ==
From Schweidnitz in Silesia (now Świdnica in Poland) he began life as secretary to Johann Thurzo, Bishop of Breslau. Later in Vienna he was court historian and poet laureate. His De Bello Pannonico chronicled the wars of Ferdinand I, Holy Roman Emperor against John Zápolya and the Ottoman Empire. It was published in 1762, in an edition by Adam František Kollár.

Velius also composed a narrative recounting ("De interitu Ludovici regis et clade Hungarie") on the death of Louis II of Hungary and the Battle of Mohács (1526), as he informed his friend Nicolaus Olahus in his letters at the turn of 1531 and 1532. The manuscript had been hidden for centuries, until a mutilated, patched version was discovered in the National Széchényi Library (OSZK) in 2018. It was translated into Hungarian within the framework of textual criticism in 2020.

A friend of Johannes Göritz (Corycius), he visited Rome as an upcoming Neo-Latin poet.

Velius' body was found in 1539 in a branch of the River Danube at Vienna.
