= Adam František Kollár =

Slovak jurist (1718–1783)

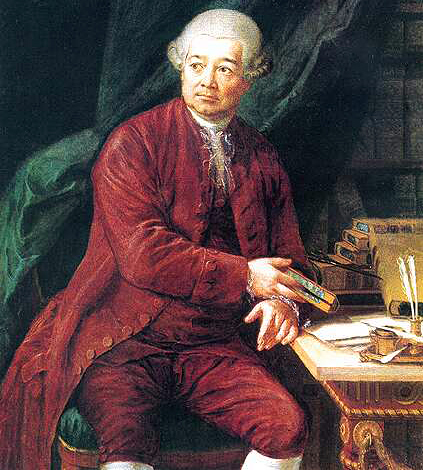
- Adam František Kollár, 1779
- Born: 17 April 1718; Tyerhova, Kingdom of Hungary (now Terchová, Slovakia)
- Died: 10 July 1783 (aged 65); Vienna, Archduchy of Austria (now Austria), Holy Roman Empire
- Other names: Adam Franciscus Kollar; Adam Franz Kollar; Kollár Ádám Ferenc
- Education: University of Vienna
- Occupations: Chief Imp.-Royal Librarian; Imp.-Royal Court Councilor
- Employer: Empress Maria Theresa
- Known for: Coined the term ethnology Contributions to Ratio educationis of 1777; Advocacy of Habsburg Enlightened centralism
- Title: Nobilis (landed in 1775)
- Predecessor: Gerard van Swieten
- Successor: Joseph von Martines
- Children: Theresa (1773–1774)
- Parent(s): Matej Kolárik; Regína Myslovská

Adam František Kollár de Keresztén (German: Adam Franz Kollar von Keresztén, Hungarian: kereszténi Kollár Ádám Ferenc; 1718–1783) was a Slovak jurist, Imperial-Royal Court Councillor and Chief Imperial-Royal Librarian, a member of Natio Hungarica in the Kingdom of Hungary, a historian, ethnologist, an influential advocate of Empress Maria Theresa's Enlightened and centralist policies. His advancement of Maria Theresa's status in the Kingdom of Hungary as its apostolic ruler in 1772 was used as an argument in support of the subsequent Habsburg annexations of Galicia and Dalmatia. Kollár is also credited with coining the term ethnology and providing its first definition in 1783. Some authors see him as one of the earliest pro-Slovak, pro-Slavic, and pan-Slavic activists in the Habsburg monarchy.

== Life ==
=== Dates ===
Kollár was born to the family of a lower nobleman probably during the week before the recorded date of his baptism on Sunday, 17 April 1718, in Terchová, now in Slovakia, then Tyerhova in the Kingdom of Hungary. Sources often give the date of his baptism as his birth date. Some earlier sources give the day of his birth as 15 April, and the oldest Austrian biographies had the year 1723. His ancestor Ladislaus (Ladislav) Kollár was ennobled in 1593. Adam F. Kollár died on 10 July 1783 in Vienna, then the capital of the Holy Roman Empire of the German Nation and the Habsburg monarchy. Sources also give other dates for his death, the 13th, and 15th of the same month.

While Kollár is likely to have used František as his middle name when he spoke in his native Slovak, he used the Latin Franciscus (also Adamo Francisco) or the German Franz as his middle name in all of his works, which were published only in the two languages. The version František did not begin to appear as his middle name in Slovak and Czech publications until later in the 20th century. Hungarian texts use Ferenc. English texts have traditionally used Franz; the more modern practice is František.

=== Education ===
Kollár's parents moved to Banská Bystrica (Besztercebánya) where he attended a Jesuit middle school. He later used the town's Latin name (Neosolium) as an appendix to his own name in some of his Latin publications − Pannonius Neosoliensis ("Pannonian of Besztercebánya"). He continued his education in a preparatory high school (gymnázium) in another mining town, Banská Štiavnica (Selmecbánya), graduated in the university town of Trnava (Nagyszombat) and joined the Society of Jesus. He attended the Jesuit College at Vienna (University of Vienna), taught at a Jesuit preparatory high school at Liptovský Svätý Mikuláš (Liptószentmiklós, now Liptovský Mikuláš) and then returned to Vienna to continue his studies.

His interest in languages showed from early on. His high school student report card graded his native Slovak and Latin as good, his German as above average. He began his studies of theology at the University of Vienna with two years of Hebrew and the Middle Eastern languages. He left the Society of Jesus upon graduation. Languages that Adam František Kollár spoke were Czech, Serbian, Polish, Rusin, Russian, Slovenian, Croatian, Bulgarian, Hungarian, German, Latin, Greek, Hebrew, Turkish, Chinese, Persian, Arabic, Italian, Romanian, French, Dutch, English, Spanish and Mixtec.

- Jesuit Slovak middle school, Banská Bystrica
- -1734 − Jesuit middle and high school, Banská Štiavnica
- 1734–1736 − Jesuit high school, Trnava
- 1736–1740 − Jesuit noviciate, Trnava
- 1740–1743 − Jesuit College (University of Vienna)
- 1744–1748 − Theology, University of Vienna

=== Employment ===
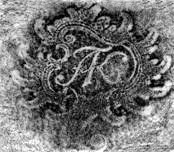
A. F. Kollár's book plate

Adam F. Kollár began his career at the Imperial-Royal Library in 1748 as a scribe and eventually became its chief librarian and Councilor at the Court of the Habsburgs. Most of his appointments were readily approved by Empress Maria Theresa, with whom he curried favor, whose policies he underpinned with his scholarship and who became his only child's godmother.

- 1743–1744 − Professor, Jesuit high school, Liptovský Svätý Mikuláš
- 1748–1749 − Scribe, Imperial-Royal Library, Vienna
- 1748–1751 − Lecturer in Classical Greek, University of Vienna
- 1749–1758 − Second Custodian, Imperial-Royal Library, Vienna
- 1758–1772 − First Custodian, Imperial-Royal Library, Vienna
- 1772–1774 − Acting Chief Librarian, Imperial-Royal Library, Vienna
- 1774–1774 − member, Imperial-Royal Court Study Commission (board of education and culture)
- 1774–1783 − Chief Librarian, Imperial-Royal Library, Vienna
- 1774- − Dean, Faculty or Arts, University of Vienna
- 1774–1783 − Councilor at the Court of the Habsburgs

== Significance ==
=== Ethnology ===
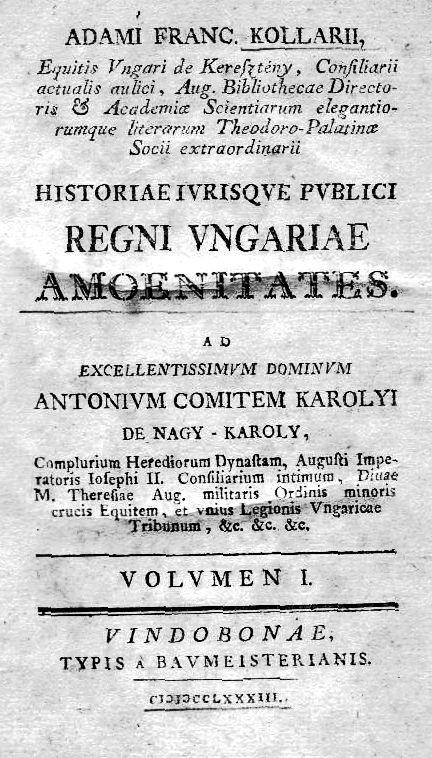
Historiae jurisque publici...

With his training in Turkish, Persian, and the classical languages, Adam F. Kollár was able to edit and publish or republish numerous manuscripts and earlier volumes from the collections of the Imperial-Royal Library. His annotated editions of texts in the languages of the Middle East area became particularly respected. As Kollár says in the introduction, he rediscovered the Turkish and Arabic fonts used by Mesgnien-Meninski in 1680 and employed them to reissue Mesgnien-Meninski's Turkish grammar. Kollár added transcriptions, texts of various treaties with the Ottoman Empire, translated it to Latin and added Arabic and Persian versions.

Kollár's editorial work with manuscripts from various cultures and languages, in addition to his familiarity with the linguistic and cultural diversity of his native Kingdom of Hungary, made him an early student of ethnology and the scholar who actually coined and defined the term in Historiae jurisque publici... published in 1783. Unlike a later, more general definition by Alexandre César de Chavannes from 1787 (sometimes mistaken for a first occurrence of the concept) who saw it as "the history of peoples progressing towards civilization", Kollár coined and defined ethnologia as:

the science of nations and peoples, or, that study of learned men in which they inquire into the origins, languages, customs, and institutions of various nations, and finally into the fatherland and ancient seats, in order to be able better to judge the nations and peoples in their own times.

Adam F. Kollár, writing in the multilingual, multiethnic Habsburg Monarchy, extended the circumscribed views of August Ludwig von Schlözer, the two had commented on each other's work, to peoples (populis) and ethnic groups−nations (gens). Kollár's word was rapidly adopted by Central European academics. It was taken up in 1787 by the German historian Johann Ernst Fabri at the University of Göttingen and by Chavannes at the Academy of Lausanne. It began to appear in French by the 1820s and in English by the 1830s.

=== Politics ===
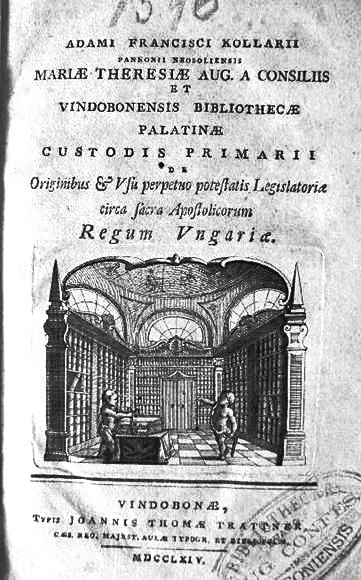
De Originibus & Usu...

Adam F. Kollár was closely associated with the centralist policies of Empress Maria Theresa. Some of his publications were commissioned by her Court, although not marked as such, many others espoused its policies. As a native of the Kingdom of Hungary, the Habsburg province that resisted centralization the most, he knew its situation. He devoted his 1764 work De Originibus et Usu perpetuo... (On the Origins and Perpetual Use of the Legislative Powers of the Apostolic Kings of Hungary in Matters Ecclesiastical) to argue for the supremacy of the Habsburgs' rule over the Roman Catholic hierarchy, over the traditional legislative powers of the Kingdom's Diet and, indirectly, over the privileges of its nobility. Kollár supported his and the Habsburgs' position with a copious body of references to the Kingdom's history, his Historiae diplomaticae... from 1762 already contained a large part of the documentation. Among other things, Kollár proposed that the tax-free status of the Kingdom's nobility be abolished. De Originibus et Usu perpetuo... brought about the most explosive event in Kollár's political life. The book caused outrage during the 1764–1765 Diet attended by Maria Theresa and did nothing to reinforce her position. She launched damage control with a ban on further distribution of Kollár's book in the Kingdom of Hungary that included a recall of the sold copies, he was given a hint by the Habsburgs to write an apology, which he did half-heartedly in the form of a defense, and the Vatican put the book on its index librorum prohibitorum where it stayed for the next two centuries.

The tensions between the Habsburgs and the Kingdom of Hungary remained largely unresolved during Kollár's lifetime and his stance brought him the wrath of his fellow noblemen in the province, but he did not relent. He lived in Vienna, the capital of all of the Habsburg Monarchy, where his views were not merely au courant among its denizens, but actually radiated from the center of power. The publication of Kollár's De Originibus et Usu perpetuo... (1764) was in line and perhaps coordinated with the Habsburgs' goals and he more than retained his status of Maria Theresa's favorite and influential academic partisan. He wrote in favor of the Habsburgs' Enlightened policies, opposed serfdom and advocated religious freedom in the whole monarchy. Maria Theresa turned to him with requests for a large number of position papers relevant to her policy. His arguments in Jurium Hungariæ in Russiam Minorem... published in Latin and German in 1772 were called on by the Habsburgs to support their subsequent annexations of Galicia and Dalmatia.

=== Nationalism ===
Linked to Adam F. Kollár's academic interest in ethnic diversity of Central Europe are his occasional comments on the developing relationships among its peoples. In tandem with his intensifying support for the suppression of the self-governing powers of the Habsburg provinces in favor of Maria Theresa's absolutist rule, he moved from his own closer identification with the Kingdom of Hungary still evidenced in the attribute Hungarus Neosoliensis he gave himself in the book he edited in 1756 (authors explain the Latin Hungarus used by ethnic non-Hungarians like Kollár as "a subject of the Kingdom's sovereign" rather than as a linguistic-ethnic attribute) to the less explicit attribute Pannonius Neosoliensis ("Pannonian of Banská Bystrica") with the name of the ancient Roman province of Pannonia as a symbolic reference to his native Kingdom's territory (although the area where he grew up, including Banská Bystrica, was never part of that province) that echoed neither its actual name, nor the name of one of its largest ethnic groups. He was one of the first academic authors who commented on the Slovaks and other Slavs of the Habsburg monarchy and on linguistic and cultural identities of its subjects in addition to their determination by political borders. Along with his centralist Habsburg-Monarchic nationalism, authors see him as an early pro-Slovak, pro-Slavic, and pan-Slavic activist in the Habsburg Monarchy. Some of the arguments brought forth by the Habsburgs in support of their annexation of parts of Poland in 1772 called on Kollár's writings on the Rusyns with the proto-ethnic-nationalist concept of their joint identity irrespective of the existing political boundaries.

=== Educational reforms ===
Kollár influenced some of Empress Maria Theresa's reforms, including her ordinance Ratio educationis in 1777, which aimed to standardize teaching methods, curricula, and textbooks. He was appreciated by the Habsburgs for the enlargement of their scholarly library collections. Maria Theresa, however, postponed indefinitely his proposal in 1774 (renewed after Kollár's similar efforts in 1735 and 1762–1763) to establish what would have been the Habsburg Monarchy's first research institute, which he and its other proponents planned to call the Academy of Sciences.

== Tribute ==
On 17 April 2013, Google celebrated his 295th birthday with a Google Doodle.

== Works ==
Sources give inconsistent titles and years of publication of some of A. F. Kollár's works. The following list matches actual library holdings of his books with the usual transliteration of the Latin titles and adjusted capitalization of the titles printed in all caps.

- 1755 − [Hoca Sadeddin Efendi] Saad ed-dini scriptoris turcici 'Annales turcici usque ad Muradem I cum textu turcico impressi'. Vienna. Translated to Latin, edited and annotated by A. F. Kollár.
- 1756 − [François de Mesgnien Meninski] Francisci à Mesgnien Meninski 'Institutiones linguae turcicae, cum rudimentis parallelis linguarum arabicae & persicae. Editio altera, methodo linguam turcicam suo marte discendi aucta'. Vienna. Edited and annotated by A. F. Kollár.
- 1760 − De commentariis in manu exaratos codices augustae bibliothecae Vindobonensis propediem praelum subituris epistola
- 1761–1762 − Analecta monumentorum omnis aevi Vindobonensia, I-II. Vienna. Edited and annotated by A. F. Kollár.
- 1762 − [Caspar Ursinus Velius] Casparis Ursini Velii 'De bello Pannonico libri decem ex codicibus manu exaratis caesareis [...] maxima exscriptis illustrati'. Vienna. Edited and annotated by A. F. Kollár.
- 1762 − Historiae diplomaticae juris patronatus apostolicorum Hungariae regum libri tres. Vienna.
- 1762 − Χαριτες ειδυλλίων [Charites eidyllion], seu Gratiae Francisco et Mariae Theresiae Augustis. In solennibus Minervae Augg. munificentia et jussu Vindobonam reductis habitae, Graece et Latine. Vienna.
- 1763 − [Nicolaus Olahus] Nicolai Olahi metropolitae Strigoniensis 'Hungaria et Attila sive de originibus gentis regni Hungariae [...] emendato coniunctim editi'. Vienna. Edited and annotated by A. F. Kollár.
- 1764 − De Originibus & Usu perpetuo potestatis Legislatoriae circa sacra Apoststolicorum Regum Ungariae. Vienna.
- 1766–1782 − [Peter Lambeck] Petri Lambecii Hamburgensis 'Commentariorum de Augustissima Bibliotheca Caesarea Vindobonensi'. 8 volumes, edited and annotated by A. F. Kollár.
- 1769 − Humillimum promemoria de ortu, progressu et in Hungaria incolatu gentis Ruthenicae. Habsburg position paper for the Vatican, manuscript. A history of the Kingdom of Hungary's Rusyns.
- 1772 − Jurium Hungariae in Russiam minorem et Podoliam, Bohemiaeque in Oswicensem et Zatoriensem ducatus explicatio. Vienna. And the same in German: Vorläufige Anführung der Rechte des Königreiches Hungarn auf Klein- oder Roth-Reussen und Podolien und des Königreichs Böheim auf die Herzogthümer Auschwitz und Zator. Vienna.
- 1774 − Anfangsgründe der lateinischen Sprache für die Oesterreichischen Staaten auf allerhöchsten Befehl verfasset. Vienna. Republished in Bratislava (Pressburg/Posonium) in 1775.
- 1775 − Etymologicum linguae latinae, in welchem die etymologischen Regeln und lateinischen Radices oder Grammwörter, wie auch die stamm- und abstammended Wörter, wie dieselben in dem 'Tirocinio analytico' nach einander folgen, enthalten sind: und welchem das 'Tirocinium syntheticum' beygefüget worden. Zum Gebrauch der öffentlichen lateinischen Schulen in den Oesterreichishchen Staaten. Vienna.
- 1777 − Ratio educationis totiusque rei literariae per regnum Hungariae et provincias eidem adnexas. Vienna. A. F. Kollár contributed to the shape of this imperial-royal ordinance.
- 1782 − In jucundissimum Vindobonam adventum Pii Pp. VI. pontificis maximi carmen. Vienna.
- 1783 − Historiae jurisque publici regni Ungariae amoenitates, I-II. Vienna.
