= Peter Lambeck =

German historian & librarian (1628–1680)

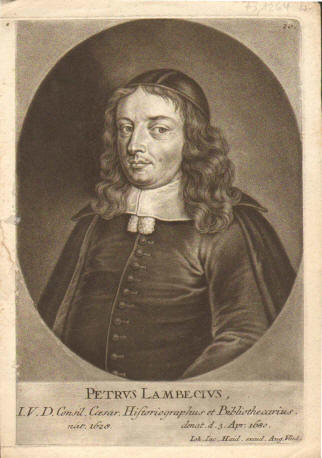
- Born: April 13, 1628; Hamburg
- Died: 4 April 1680 (aged 51); Vienna
- Education: University of Amsterdam; University of Paris
- Scientific career
- Fields: historian and librarian.
- Workplaces: Vienna librarian and court historiographer

Peter Lambeck (1628–1680) was a German historian and librarian.

== Life ==
He was born in Hamburg on April 13, 1628.

In 1644 he entered in the gymnasium where he came under the influence of his mother's brother, Lucas Holstenius, the most distinguished philologian, antiquarian, and critic of his time. The latter had early recognized his nephew's gifts, and entered into a lively correspondence with the lad of barely twelve. On his recommendation, Lambeck went to Holland in 1645 to continue his studies, and at the University of Amsterdam, came in contact with many scholars, especially the philologian Gerhard Johann Vossius. He later left the Netherlands at his uncle's wish and went to Paris, where his relationship with the celebrated Holstenius, as well as his own abilities, secured him access to the most distinguished savants of his time. He here received the degree of Doctor of Laws.

After finishing his studies, Lambeck made a tour through France, Liguria, and Etruria, and spent two years in Rome, where under the special direction of his uncle, who had become papal librarian, he undertook classical and historical researches. When barely nineteen, his learned work had already brought him the approval of the learned public of Paris.

On his return to Hamburg in 1652, he was made professor of history at the gymnasium, and in 1660 became rector of the local college. He had many enemies on account of his success, and, being accused of atheism, decided to give up his position. His decision to leave the country and return to Rome was facilitated by an unhappy marriage, which he had entered into shortly before. In Rome he soon won the favor of Alexander VII. Queen Christina of Sweden, then resident at Rome, also exercised a great influence over him, and soon he entered the Catholic Church. To secure a permanent position he went to Vienna, where Emperor Leopold appointed him librarian and court historiographer. In this position he performed great services by his arrangement of the library, and especially by his catalogues of its treasures. These catalogues are even of value today, being especially important for the numerous contributions they contain to our knowledge of the Old German language and literature. Of great importance for the history of literature is his Prodromus Historiae literariae, of which a second enlarged edition was issued by J. A. Fabricius with a biographical sketch of the author, published separately at Hamburg in 1724. The Prodromus was the first comprehensive history of literature, chronologically arranged. Among other works, Lambeck also published a history of his native town, and researches into the history of the Byzantine Empire.

The physician Edward Browne on his travels while at Vienna in 1677 records:

The worthy Petrus Lambecius his Library Keeper, and who is in great esteem with him,(Emperor Leopold) will usually find out some Books for him which he conceiveth may be acceptable. While I was there he recommended a Translation of Religio Medici unto him, wherewith the Emperour (Leopold) was exceedingly pleased, and spake very much of it unto Lambecius, insomuch that Lambecius asked me whether I knew the Author,(Thomas Browne) he being of my own name, and whether he were living: And when he understood my near Relation to him, he became more kind and courteous than ever, and desired me to send him that Book in the Original English, which he would put into the Emperors Library.

Lambeck died in Vienna on April 4, 1680.

== Works ==
- Commentariorum de augustissima bibliotheca Caesarea Vindobonensi liber 1-4. Vienna, 1665-1671.
  - Petri Lambecii Hamburgensis Commentariorum de Augustissima Bibliotheca Caesarea Vindobonensi. Vienna, 1766-1782. 8 volumes, edited and annotated by Adam F. Kollár.
- Prodromus historiae literariae, et Tabula duplex chronographica universalis. Hamburgi, Sumptibus Autoris, 1659. Curante Jo. Alberto Fabricio [...], Hamburgi, 1710.
