= Miklós Istvánffy =

Hungarian politician, Humanist historian and poet

- Baron of Baranyavár and Kisasszonyfalva
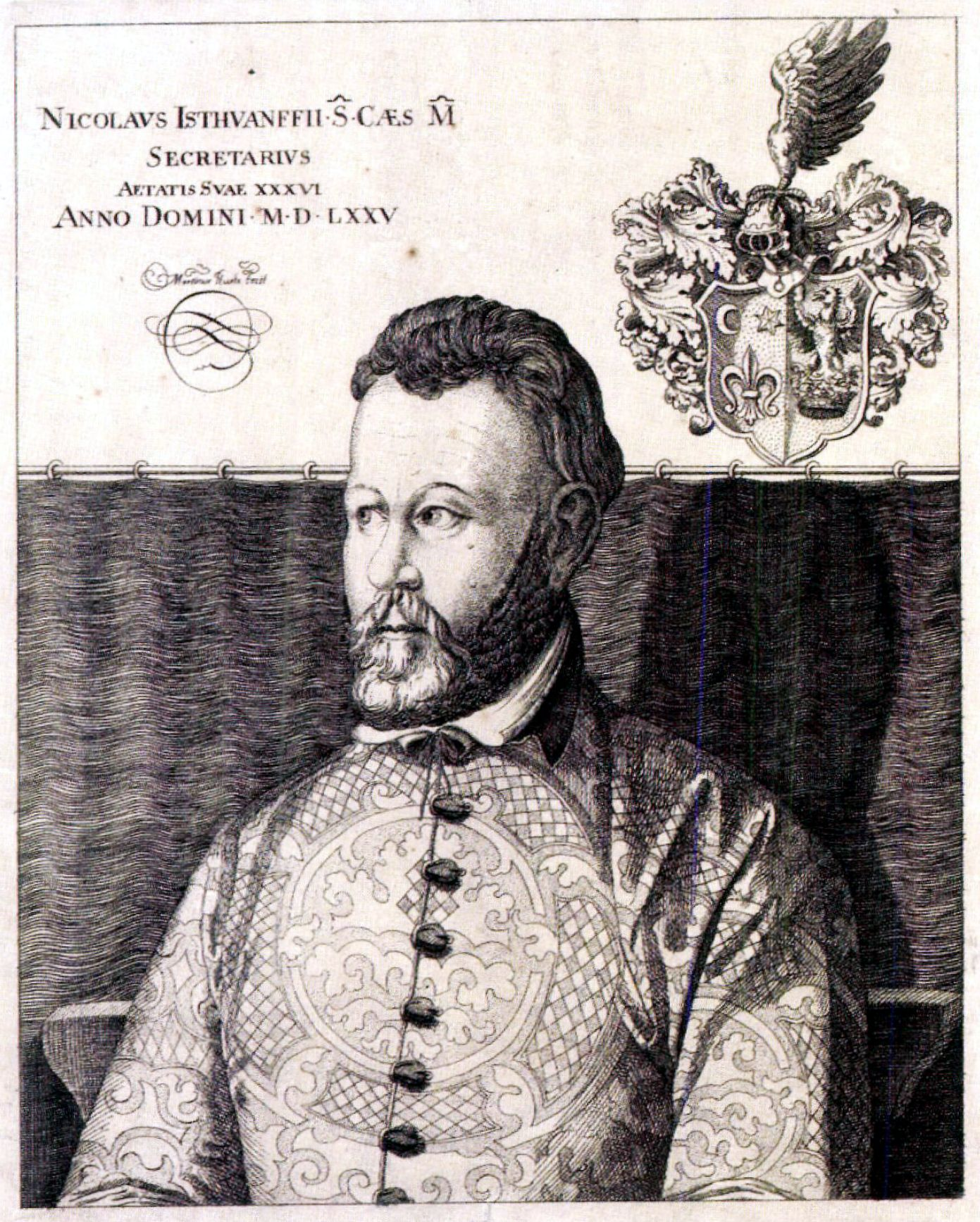

Palatinal Governor of Hungary
- Reign: 19 January 1582 – November 1608
- Predecessor: Imre Czobor
- Successor: office abolished
- Full name: Baron Miklós Istvánffy de Baranyavár et Kisasszonyfalva
- Born: December 8, 1538; Kisasszonyfa, Kingdom of Hungary
- Died: April 1, 1615 (aged 76); Vinica, Kingdom of Croatia
- Noble family: House of Istvánffy
- Spouse: Erzsébet Both de Bajna
- Issue: See below for issue
- Father: Pál Istvánfi
- Mother: Hedvig Gyulay

Baron Miklós Istvánffy de Baranyavár et Kisasszonyfalva (Latin: Nicolaus Istuanfius; 8 December 1538 – 1 April 1615) was a Hungarian politician, Humanist historian and poet, who served as Palatinal Governor of Hungary (Hungarian: nádori helytartó) from 19 January 1582 to November 1608.

He is often called as "Livy of Hungary", because of his historiographical activity and, because, he studied in Padua, the birthplace of the great Roman historian (then called Patavium).

== Life ==
He was the second son of Pál Istvánfi ("son of István"), who functioned as Ispán (Count; comes) of Baranya County and was also a member of the Royal Council. His mother was his father's second wife, Hedvig Gyulay. One of his brothers, István (d. 1585) held the office of Vice-ispán (Viscount; vicecomes) of Veszprém County. The family had to leave Baranya County, when the Ottomans invaded and occupied Pécs in 1543 (the Christian armies were able to recapture the town only in 1686). Istvánffy served archbishop Pál Várdai as his page in Nagyszombat (today: Trnava, Slovakia). After the death of Várdai (1549), he became a protegee of Nicolaus Olahus. He studied at the universities of Bologna and Padua after 1551; at the latter place he learned Latin philology from the great Humanist scholar János Zsámboky.

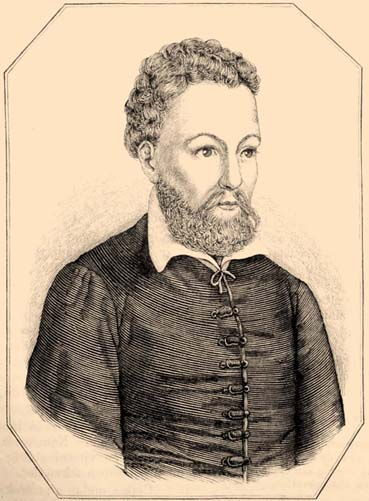
Miklós Istvánffy (Vasárnapi Újság, 1857)

Istvánffy returned home in 1556 and presumably became a soldier of Nikola IV Zrinski (Hungarian: Zrínyi Miklós), the hero of th Siege of Szigetvár. Between 1558 and 1559 he functioned as the secretary of Olahus, who served as Chancellor of Hungary from 1543. Istvánffy became an official of the Chancellery after 1559. Olahus was appointed Royal Governor of Hungary in 1562. He died in 1568.

He tried to acquire new estates and lands to the place of his former possession, but failed. In 1576, he was a royal envoy to Pasha of the Budin Eyalet to returning to occupied castles in peacetime, unsuccessfully. He had been a Royal Councillor since 1578. After the death of Imre Czobor, he was appointed Palatinal Governor (or Vice-palatine) by King Rudolf on 24 June 1581, however the Diet of Hungary approved the appointment only in January 1582. Istvánffy was responsible for the judicial affairs. He was appointed Castellan of Sopron Castle in 1585. He served as envoy, along with Péter Heresiniczy, the bishop of Győr and Chancellor of Hungary, to the Kingdom of Poland to releasing Archduke Maximilian, between December 1588 and March 1589.

During the Long Turkish War, he was unlawfully authorized to recover the war tax in Slavonia. He participated in the Battle of Pákozd on 3 November 1593, and the Siege of Petrinja in the summer of 1595. He was one of Rudolf's three delegates who took over the control of Transylvania from Prince Sigismund Báthory in 1598. He was also present at the Siege of Kanizsa (1601)), when the town fell to Tiryaki Hasan Pasha and became the capital of the newly established Kanije Eyalet. One year later, the Christian armies tried to recapture the town but suffered a heavy and decisive defeat.

Istvánffy served as master of the doorkeepers (Hungarian: főajtónállómester, Latin: magister janitorum) from 1599 until his death. In 1603, he drafted the judgment under which the Lutheran István Illésházy was illegally sentenced to death and confiscation of property. As a result, he attracted the hatred of the Protestant aristocrats. In 1605, he was one of the members of the Habsburg delegation which was responsible for the termination of cooperation between Ahmed I and Stephen Bocskay. He was one of the signatories of the Peace of Zsitvatorok (1606) which ended the Fifteen Years or Long War. In 1608, István Pálffy and Miklós Istvánffy traveled to Hainburg to invite Archduke Matthias before the Diet of Hungary. During that he suffered a stroke and his right arm was paralyzed.

He was one of the four candidates for the position of Palatine in the same year, but defeated by his former opponent István Illésházy. He suffered a stroke again and retired from the public life. He died in 1615 and was buried in Vinica.

== Marriage ==
Istvánffy married Erzsébet Both de Bajna in 1569, daughter of George Both de Bajna and Borbála Hásshágy. They had four children:

- Éva, married Ivan Drašković, Ban of Croatia (1550–1613)
- Orsolya, married János Dóczy de Lipcse
- Katalin, married György Keglevich de Buzin
- Pál (d. March 1581)

== Sources ==
- Markó, László: A magyar állam főméltóságai Szent Istvántól napjainkig – Életrajzi Lexikon p. 232. (The High Officers of the Hungarian State from Saint Stephen to the Present Days – A Biographical Encyclopedia) (2nd edition); Helikon Kiadó Kft., 2006, Budapest; ISBN 963-547-085-1.
- Magyar életrajzi lexikon 1000-1990
- Mimi.hu
- Istvánffy arcképe
- Az Istvánffy család leszármazása
- Révai nagy lexikona (X. kötet, HÉROLD-JÓB)

Political offices
Preceded by Imre Czobor	Palatinal Governor of Hungary; 1581–1608	Succeeded by office abolished
Preceded by Ferenc Révay	Master of the doorkeepers 1599–1615	Succeeded by László Pethe
