= Erzsébet Czobor =

- Baroness of Czoborszentmihály
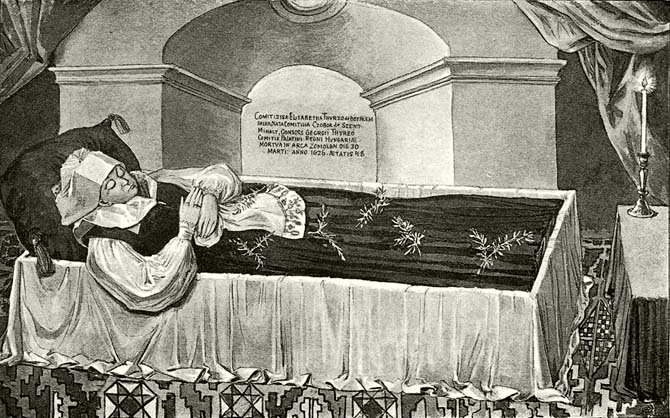
- Baroness Erzsébet in her bier
- Full name: Baroness Erzsébet Czobor de Czoborszentmihály
- Born: 1572
- Died: 31 March 1626 (aged 53–54); Szomolány, Kingdom of Hungary (today: Smolenice, Slovakia)
- Noble family: House of Czobor; House of Thurzó
- Spouse: Count György Thurzó de Bethlenfalva (1592–1616)
- Issue: Imre
- Father: Baron Imre Czobor de Czoborszentmihály
- Mother: Borbála Perényi de Perény

Baroness Erzsébet Czobor de Czoborszentmihály (1572 – 31 March 1626) was the second wife of Palatine György Thurzó.

== Biography ==
Her parents were Imre Czobor, who served as Palatinal Governor of Hungary between 1572 and 1581, and his third wife, Borbála Perényi de Perény.

Thurzó and Erzsébet married on 2 February 1592 in Sasvár (today part of Šaštín-Stráže, Slovakia). They had several children:

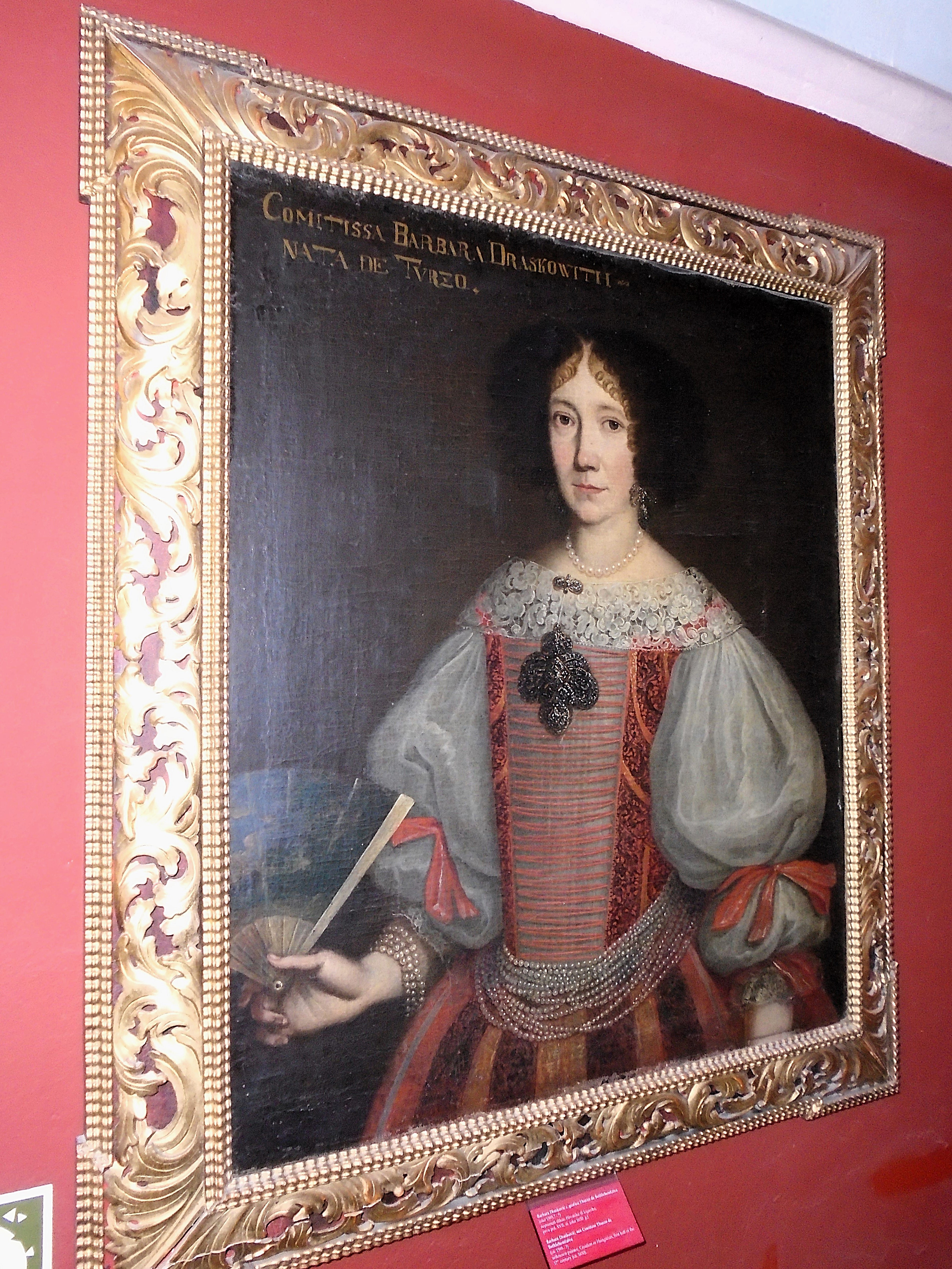
Portrait of Borbála (Barbara) Drašković, Erzsébet's daughter and wife of Ivan III Drašković, Ban (Viceroy) of Croatia and Palatine of Hungary

== Notable members ==
- János, died young
- Borbála, she married twice:
  - 30 September 1612: Count Kristóf Erdődy de Monyorókerék et Monoszló (d. 1621)
  - 29 January 1629 (Zólyom): Count Ivan III Drašković of Trakošćan, Ban (Viceroy) of Croatia (1639–1646) and Palatine of Hungary (1646–1648)
- Ilona, married to Count Gáspár Illésházy (d. 1648)
- Imre (11 September 1598 – 19 October 1621), Perpetual Ispán (Count; comes) of Árva County and Rector of the University of Wittenberg (1616–1621), the last male member of the Thurzó family
- Mária, married to Mihály Vízkelethy in 1618
- Katalin (d. 1647), married to Baron István Thököly de Késmárk (1581–1651) in 1620, paternal grandmother of Count Imre Thököly
- Anna, married to Baron János Szunyogh de Jeszenicze et Budatin (d. 1641) in 1622
- Erzsébet

== Sources ==
- Miklós Kubinyi: Bethlenfalvi gróf Thurzó Imre 1598–1621, Budapest, Méhner Vilmos kiadása, 1888
