= Fonsol =

Hungarian lord

Palatine of Hungary
- Reign: c. 1131–1138
- Predecessor: John
- Successor: Beloš
- Died: after 1138
- Father: Bozeta

Fonsol (Hungarian: Fancsal or Foncsol; died after 1138) was a Hungarian lord in the first half of the 12th century, who served as Palatine of Hungary from around 1131 to 1138, during the reign of Béla II of Hungary.

== Career ==
Fonsol was the son of a certain Bozeta (or Buzita). It is plausible that the noble family possessed lands in Abaúj County in Northeast Hungary, since the location of the eponymous villages Buzita (present-day Buzica, Slovakia) and Fancsal (present-day in Borsod-Abaúj-Zemplén County).

Violent purges were carried out among the partisans of his predecessors to strengthen the rule of Béla II shortly after his coronation in 1131, consequently Fonsol was among those nobles, who expressed their displeasure with the reign of Stephen II prior to 1131. Shortly after Béla's ascension to the Hungarian throne, Fonsol was made Palatine of Hungary around 1131. He first appears in this dignity, when the monarch judged over a lawsuit between the Bakonybél Abbey and Opus, the count (ispán) of udvornici in Pápa, following an investigation process conducted by a five-member ad litem court of which Fonsol was a member.

Fonsol was styled as "palatinus comes" (1131), "curialis comes" (1137), then "comes prefectus" (1138). Regarding the latter two, historians Péter Váczy and Attila Zsoldos considered the phrase applied to Fonsol's term a palatine, while other historians – for instance, Tibor Szőcs – claimed Fonsol already functioned as Judge royal by 1137. In that year, Fonsol ("Fanczellus") belonged to the accompaniment of King Béla II during the foundation of the Benedictine abbey of Csatár, according to a later document issued by Géza II. Fonsol is last mentioned as palatine in 1138, when he was present at the Dömös Chapter on the occasion of the confirmation of its privileges by Béla II. His fate is unknown. Around 1165, a certain comes Fonsol is mentioned as a member of the royal court of Stephen III.

== Sources ==
- Markó, László (2006). A magyar állam főméltóságai Szent Istvántól napjainkig: Életrajzi Lexikon [Great Officers of State in Hungary from King Saint Stephen to Our Days: A Biographical Encyclopedia] (in Hungarian). Helikon Kiadó. ISBN 963-547-085-1.
- Szőcs, Tibor (2014). A nádori intézmény korai története, 1000–1342 [An Early History of the Palatinal Institution: 1000–1342] (in Hungarian). Magyar Tudományos Akadémia Támogatott Kutatások Irodája. ISBN 978-963-508-697-9.
- Zsoldos, Attila (2011). Magyarország világi archontológiája, 1000–1301 [Secular Archontology of Hungary, 1000–1301] (in Hungarian). História, MTA Történettudományi Intézete. ISBN 978-963-9627-38-3.

Political offices
Preceded by John	Palatine of Hungary c. 1131–1138	Succeeded by Beloš
