= Tamás Nádasdy =

16th century Hungarian statesman

- Baron Tamás Nádasdy
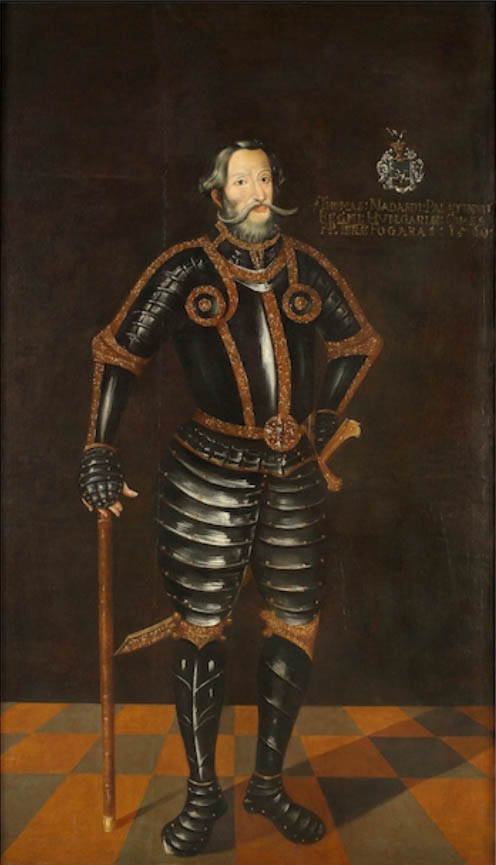
- Full name: Tamás Nádasdy of Nádasd and Fogarasföld
- Born: 1498
- Died: 2 June 1562 (approx. 64 years old); Egervár, Kingdom of Hungary
- Noble family: House of Nádasdy
- Spouse: Orsolya Kanizsay de Kanizsa
- Issue: László Nádasdy de Nádasd et Fogarasföld; Márton Nádasdy de Nádasd et Fogarasföld; Ferenc Nádasdy de Nádasd et Fogarasföld
- Father: Ferenc Nádasdy de Nádasd et Fogarasföld
- Mother: Orsolya Therjék de Szenterzsébet
- Occupation: Soldier

Baron Tamás Nádasdy de Nádasd et Fogarasföld (I), called the Great Palatine (1498–1562), was Hungarian nobleman, great landowner and a statesman.

== Early life ==
Born into the House of Nádasdy, he was the son of Ferenc I Nádasdy de Nádasd (1492-1541) and his first wife, Orsolya Therjék de Szenterzsébet (d. 1529). After Tamás's mother's death, his father remarried to Orsolya Véssey de Vésse.

== Biography ==
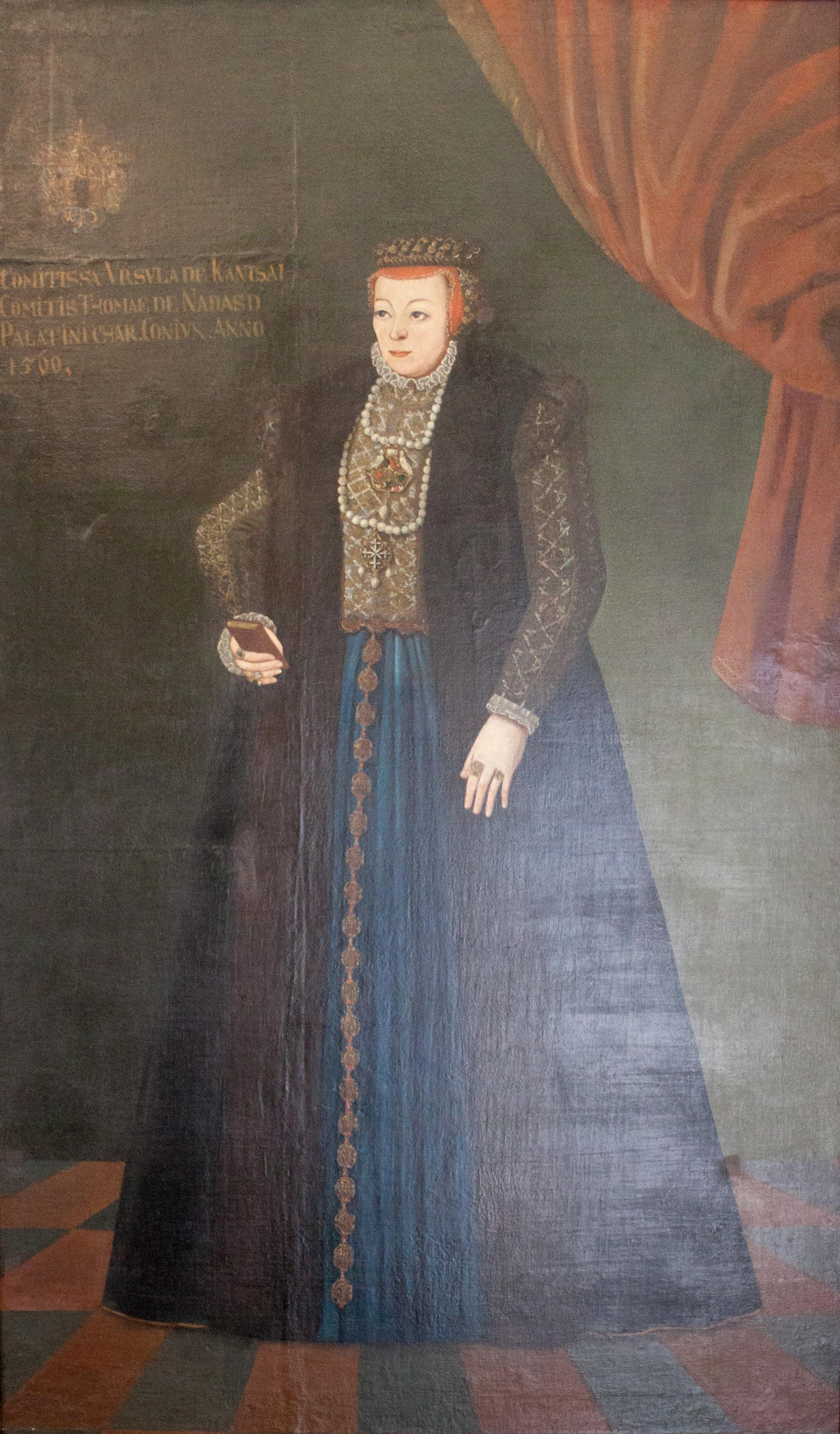
Tamás's wife, Orsolya Kanizsai de Kanizsa (1523-1571)

He was educated at Graz, Bologna and Rome. In 1521 he accompanied Thomas Cajetan (whom the pope had sent to Hungary to preach a crusade against the Turks) to Buda as his interpreter. In 1525 he became a member of the council of state and was sent by King Louis II to the diet of Speyer to ask for help in the imminent Turkish war. During his absence the Mohács catastrophe took place, and Nádasdy only returned to Hungary in time to escort the queen-widow from Komárom to Pozsony. He was sent to offer the Hungarian crown to the archduke Ferdinand, and on his coronation (3 November 1527) was made commandant of Buda. In 1528 with the help of György Cseszneky, commander of Tata Nádasdy occupied Győr for Ferdinand. On the capture of Buda by Suleiman the Magnificent, Nádasdy went over to King John I. In 1530 he successfully defended Buda against the imperial troops. In 1533 his jealousy of the dominant influence of Lodovico Gritti caused him to desert John for Ferdinand, to whom he afterwards remained faithful. In 1535 he married Orsolya Kanizsay de Kanizsa (1523-1571), the last member and heiress of the powerful and wealthy Kanizsay family. He was endowed with enormous estates by the emperor, and from 1537 onwards became Ferdinand's secret but most influential counsellor. Subsequently, as Ban of Croatia-Slavonia, he valiantly defended that border province against the Turks.

He did his utmost to promote education, and the school which he founded at Újsziget, where he also set up a printing press, received a warm eulogy from Philip Melanchthon. In 1540 Nádasdy was appointed iudex curie regie; in 1547 he presided over the Diet of Nagyszombat, and finally, in 1559, was elected palatine by the diet of Pozsony. In his declining years, he aided Miklós Zrinyi against the Ottomans.

Political offices
Preceded by Ferenc Újlaky as Royal Governor	Palatine and Royal Governor of Hungary; 1554–1562	Succeeded by Miklós Oláh as Royal Governor
Preceded by Ferenc Révay as Palatinal Governor	Palatine and Royal Governor of Hungary; 1554–1562	Succeeded by Mihály Mérey as Palatinal Governor
