= Buzica =

Buzica Buzita
- Municipality
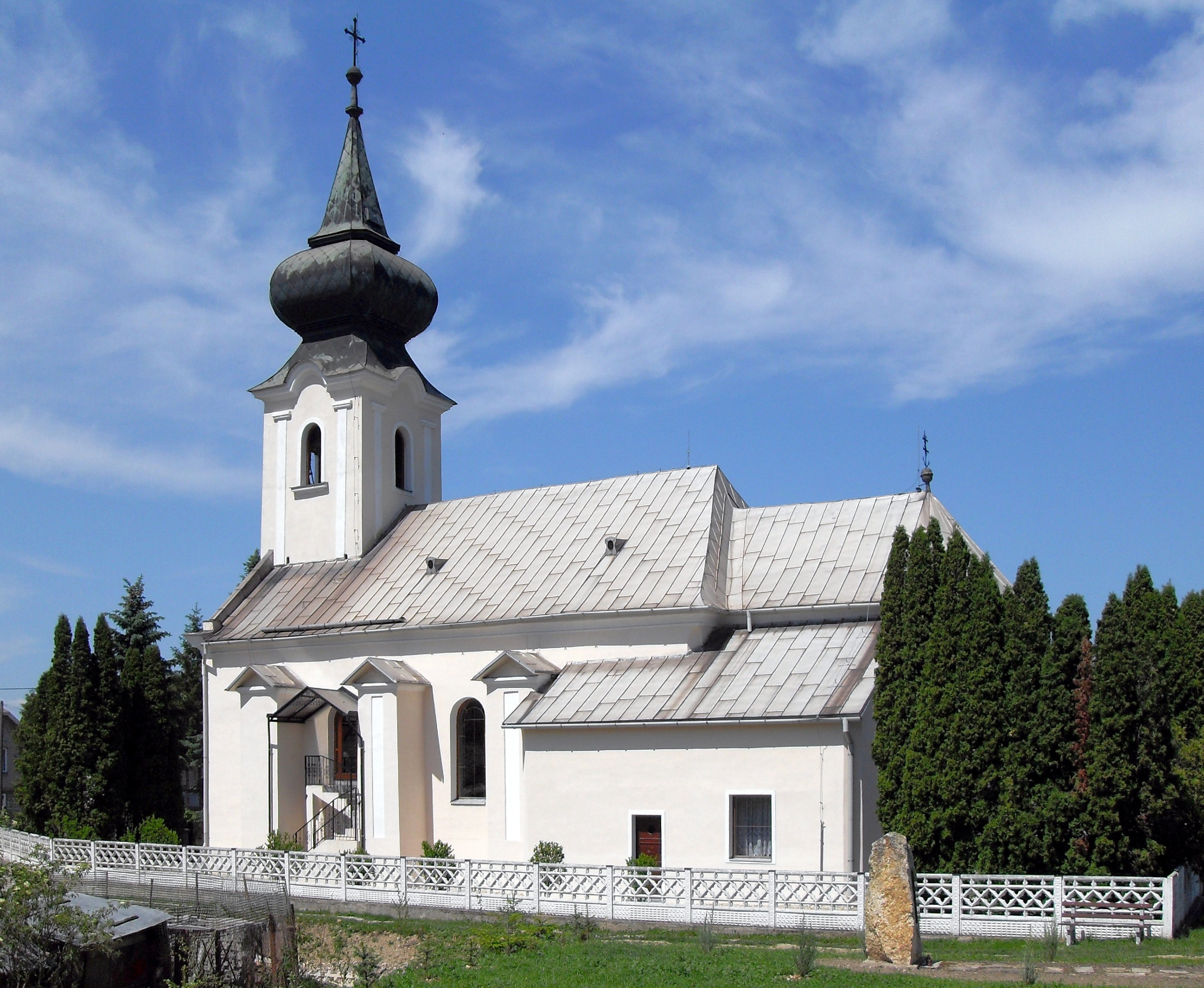
- Catholic church in the village

- Flag

- Location of Buzica in the Košice Region Location of Buzica in Slovakia
- Coordinates: 48.53°N 21.08°E
- Country: Slovakia
- Region: Košice Region
- District: Košice-okolie District
- First mentioned: 1262

Government
  - Mayor: Jozef Mohňanský (SMK-MKP)

Area
  - Total: 19.86 km^{2} (7.67 sq mi)
- Elevation: 214 m (702 ft)

Population (2025)
  - Total: 1,154
- Time zone: UTC+1 (CET)
  - Summer (DST): UTC+2 (CEST)
- Postal code: 447 3
- Area code: +421 55
- Vehicle registration plate (until 2022): KS
- Website: obecbuzica.sk

Buzica (Hungarian: Buzita) is a village and municipality in Košice-okolie District in the Kosice Region of eastern Slovakia.

== Geography ==
The municipality lies at an altitude of 214 metres (702 ft) and covers an area of 19.86 km^{2} (7.67 sq mi) (2025).

The village is located around 26 km southwest of Košice on the border with Hungary.

== History ==
Historically the village was first mentioned in 1262.

== Population ==
Population statistic (10 years)
Year	1995	2005	2015	2025
Count	1090	1171	1205	1154
Difference		+7.43%	+2.90%	−4.23%

Population statistic
Year	2024	2025
Count	1157	1154
Difference		−0.25%

It has a population of 1154 people (31 December 2025).

In 1910, the village had a population of 1088, mostly Hungarians.

=== Ethnicity ===
Census 2021 (1+ %)
Ethnicity	Number	Fraction
Hungarian	641	52.88%
Slovak	607	50.08%
Not found out	57	4.7%
Romani	38	3.13%
Total	1212	

In year 2021 was 1212 people by ethnicity 641 as Hungarian, 607 as Slovak, 57 as Not found out, 38 as Romani, 4 as Czech, 2 as Rusyn, 1 as Polish, 1 as Greek and 1 as English.

Note on population: The difference values of population numbers in the table "Population statistic" and in the sections "Ethnicity" & "Religion" is caused by the use of various statistical methods.

=== Religion ===
Census 2021 (1+ %)
Religion	Number	Fraction
Roman Catholic Church	908	74.92%
None	107	8.83%
Calvinist Church	94	7.76%
Not found out	42	3.47%
Greek Catholic Church	24	1.98%
Evangelical Church	13	1.07%
Total	1212	

In year 2021 was 1212 people by religion 908 from Roman Catholic Church, 107 from None, 94 from Calvinist Church, 42 from Not found out, 24 from Greek Catholic Church, 13 from Evangelical Church, 10 from Jehovah's Witnesses, 5 from Other and not ascertained christian church, 4 from Christian Congregations in Slovakia, 2 from Ad hoc movements, 1 from Eastern Orthodox Church, 1 from Church of Jesus Christ of Latter-day Saints and 1 from Buddhism.

== Genealogical resources ==
The records for genealogical research are available at the state archive "Statny Archiv in Kosice, Slovakia"

- Roman Catholic church records (births/marriages/deaths): 1741-1895 (parish A)
- Greek Catholic church records (births/marriages/deaths): 1791-1896 (parish B)
- Reformated church records (births/marriages/deaths): 1741-1920 (parish A)

== See also ==
- List of municipalities and towns in Slovakia
