= Ferenc Révay =

16th-century Hungarian noble

- Lord of Szklabina and Blatnicza
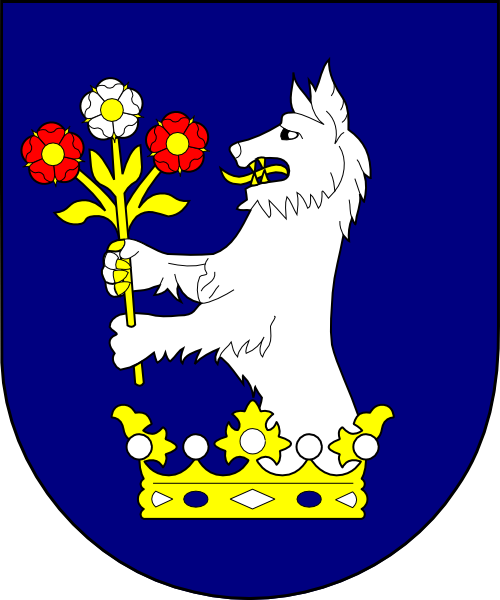
- Coat of Arms of Ferenc Révay

Palatinal Governor of Hungary
- Reign: 26 November 1542 – 1 November 1553
- Predecessor: First in office
- Successor: Tamás Nádasdy (as Palatine)
- Full name: Ferenc Révay de Szklabina et Blatnicza
- Born: 1489
- Died: 1 November 1553 (aged 63–64); Pozsony (Pressburg), Kingdom of Hungary (today: Bratislava, Slovakia)
- Noble family: House of Révay
- Spouses: Borbála Gyulay; Anna Paksy
- Father: László Révay de Aranyán
- Mother: Anna Eszteleky

Ferenc Révay de Szklabina et Blatnicza, (1489 – 1 November 1553, Pozsony (today Bratislava, Slovakia)) was the Palatinal Governor (Hungarian: nádori helytartó) in the Kingdom of Hungary, thus was ranking third to the Kings Number.

== Biography ==
Révay was the son of László Révay and Anna Eszteleky. Ferenc Révay became the personal secretary of Stephen Báthory in 1521. After the Battle of Mohács in 1526, during the dispute over the throne, he joined Ferdinand I of the Habsburgs. Following the call of his brother, István Révay, and Jovan Nenad joined Ferdinand, Ferdinand seized the throne, Ferenc Révay was elected as Royal Tablemaster, and as a royal donation, he received half of the Szklabina fortress, which he took full control of in 1540.

In 1532, Révay became the Ispán (Count; comes) of Turóc County (Turiec region in today's Slovakia). He was then granted the rank of Chief Justice (Hungarian: királyi személynök) and received numerous donations. He became Palatinal Governor in 1542. He was present in the Parliament of 1550, where he was elected as the member of the Border-Check Committee.

Révay favoured science and scientists. He regularly communicated with András Gyulai and András Choron. He was an admirer of Martin Luther, and they exchanged several letters.

== Sources ==
- Szinnyei, József (2000), Magyar írók élete és munkái [Life and Works of Hungarian Writers] (in Hungarian), Budapest: Arcanum, ISBN 978-9638602992

Political offices
Preceded by Pál Várdai	Chief justice 1527–1542	Succeeded by Mihály Mérey
Preceded by office created	Palatinal Governor of Hungary; 1542–1553	Succeeded by Tamás Nádasdy as Palatine
