= Julius, Palatine of Hungary =

Hungarian lord

Julius

Palatine of Hungary
- Reign: 1075–c. 1090
- Predecessor: Rodowan
- Successor: Peter
- Died: 1099; Hungary

Julius (Latin: Jula, Hungarian: Gyula; died 1099) was a Hungarian lord in the second half of the 11th century, who served as Palatine of Hungary at least from 1075 to 1090, during the reigns of Géza I then Ladislaus I.

== Career ==
Julius (Jula, Gula or Iula) was a confidant of King Géza I. He is first styled as Palatine of Hungary in the establishing charter of the Garamszentbenedek Abbey (present-day Hronský Beňadik, Slovakia) in 1075. Géza I referred to Julius as "my count palatine" (Latin: Jula comite meo palatino) in the document, which possibly reflects the situation that Géza's rival Solomon, who ruled westernmost part of the kingdom, also appointed a palatine in his royal court. Julius retained his position for most of the reign of Ladislaus I, who ascended the Hungarian throne in 1077. The name of Julius (as "Gula") appears among the witnesses in the charter of prince David around 1089 or 1090, who donated several landholdings and fishponds to the Tihany Abbey.

The judgment letter of Felician, Archbishop of Esztergom from 1134, which recounts in detail the foundation of the Diocese of Zagreb, also mentions that Julius was present during the act in his capacity as palatine. There is no agreement between Hungarian and Croatian historiography as to when the diocese was founded. Hungarian historian Bálint Hóman considered the establishment occurred prior to the Hungarian campaign to the Kingdom of Croatia in 1091 (most probably between 1087 and 1090), after analyzing the participants, including Julius, since a certain Peter was already styled as Palatine of Hungary in 1091. Croatian historian Ferdo Šišić rejected Hóman's proposal; he considered the territory of Slavonia belonged to the Kingdom of Croatia before Ladislaus' invasion. Šišić argued it is possible that Palatine Julius, who was first mentioned in this capacity in 1075 is not identical with that namesake lord, who was present during the foundation of the Diocese of Zagreb. Šišić put the date of the process to 1094, also considering that Julius (again) functioned as palatine in that year. Tamás Körmendi argued the foundation took place in 1089 or 1090.

== Death ==
Julius – as mentioned above – was replaced as palatine by Peter in 1091. Nevertheless, Julius retained his influence in the royal court, bearing the honorary title comes, and was also a confidant of Coloman, King of Hungary. According to the Illuminated Chronicle, comes Julius ("Iula") participated in the royal campaign against the Kievan Rus' in 1099. He fought in the siege of Peremyshl (present-day Przemyśl, Poland) and the subsequent battle against the Cumans, where the Hungarian army was soundly defeated. Julius although wounded in the foot survived, but died of this wound after his return to Hungary.

== Sources ==
- Körmendi, Tamás (2012). "A zágrábi püspökség alapítási éve [The Date of the Foundation of the Zagreb Bishopric]". In Bagi, Dániel; Fedeles, Tamás; Kiss, Gergely (eds.). "Köztes-Európa vonzásában". Ünnepi tanulmányok Font Márta tiszteletére (in Hungarian). Kronosz Kiadó. pp. 329–341. ISBN 978-615-5181-69-6.
- Makk, Ferenc; Thoroczkay, Gábor (2006). Írott források az 1050–1116 közötti magyar történelemről [Written Sources of the Hungarian History between 1050 and 1116] (in Hungarian). Szegedi Középkorász Műhely. ISBN 978-963-482-794-8.
- Markó, László (2006). A magyar állam főméltóságai Szent Istvántól napjainkig: Életrajzi Lexikon [Great Officers of State in Hungary from King Saint Stephen to Our Days: A Biographical Encyclopedia] (in Hungarian). Helikon Kiadó. ISBN 963-547-085-1.
- Szőcs, Tibor (2014). A nádori intézmény korai története, 1000–1342 [An Early History of the Palatinal Institution: 1000–1342] (in Hungarian). Magyar Tudományos Akadémia Támogatott Kutatások Irodája. ISBN 978-963-508-697-9.
- Zsoldos, Attila (2011). Magyarország világi archontológiája, 1000–1301 [Secular Archontology of Hungary, 1000–1301] (in Hungarian). História, MTA Történettudományi Intézete. ISBN 978-963-9627-38-3.

Political offices
Preceded by Rodowan	Palatine of Hungary; 1075–c. 1090	Succeeded by Peter
