= Imre Czobor =

- Baron of Czoborszentmihály
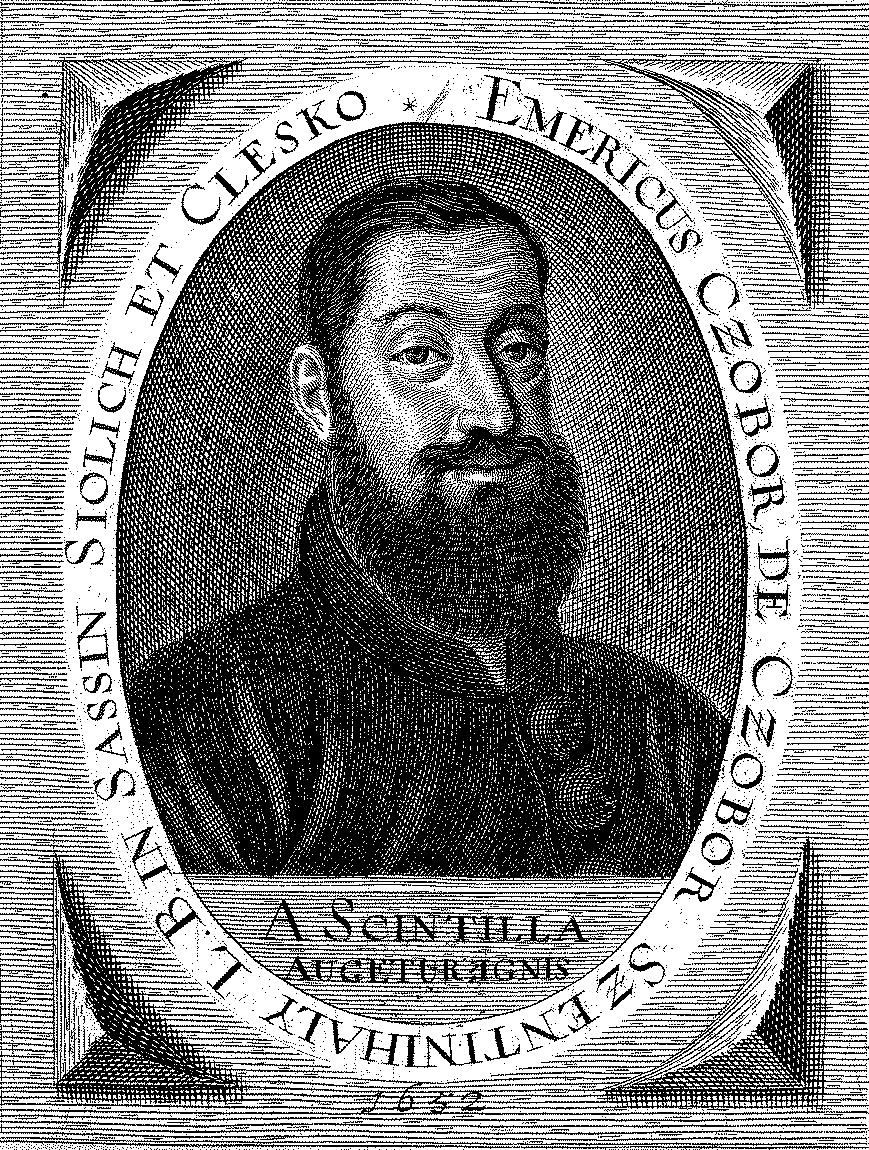

Palatinal Governor of Hungary
- Reign: February 1572 – 8 June 1581
- Predecessor: Mihály Mérey
- Successor: Miklós Istvánffy
- Full name: Baron Imre Czobor de Czoborszentmihály
- Born: 1520
- Died: 8 June 1581 (aged 60–61)
- Noble family: House of Czobor
- Spouses: Angelika Bakith; Katarina Frankopan (daughter of Juraj III Frankopan); Borbála Perényi de Perény
- Issue: Erzsébet
- Father: Gáspár Czobor de Czoborszentmihály
- Mother: Orsolya Sárkány de Ákosháza

Baron Imre Czobor de Czoborszentmihály (1520 – 8 June 1581) was a Hungarian noble and statesman, who served as Palatinal Governor of Hungary (Hungarian: nádori helytartó) from February 1572 to 8 June 1581.

His daughter was Erzsébet Czobor, the second wife of Palatine György Thurzó.

== Sources ==
- Markó, László: A magyar állam főméltóságai Szent Istvántól napjainkig – Életrajzi Lexikon p. 219. (The High Officers of the Hungarian State from Saint Stephen to the Present Days – A Biographical Encyclopedia) (2nd edition); Helikon Kiadó Kft., 2006, Budapest; ISBN 963-547-085-1.

Political offices
Preceded by Mihály Mérey	Palatinal Governor of Hungary; 1572–1581	Succeeded by Miklós Istvánffy
