= Mihály Mérey =

Hungarian jurist and noble (1500–1572)

- Baron of Kaposmére

Palatinal Governor of Hungary
- Reign: 25 September 1562 – 26 February 1572
- Predecessor: Tamás Nádasdy (as Palatine)
- Successor: Imre Czobor
- Full name: Baron Mihály Mérey de Kaposmére
- Born: 1500
- Died: 26 February 1572 (aged 71–72); Pozsony (Pressburg), Kingdom of Hungary (today: Bratislava, Slovakia)
- Noble family: House of Mérey
- Spouse: Julianna Forgách de Ghymes et Gács
- Father: János Mérey de Kaposmére
- Mother: Margit Hanyi

Baron Mihály Mérey de Kaposmére (Mérei; 1500 – 26 February 1572) was a Hungarian jurist and noble, who served as Palatinal Governor (Hungarian: nádori helytartó) in the Kingdom of Hungary, between 1562 and 1572.

== Biography ==
Mérey studied law in the court of Elek Thurzó, the Royal Governor of Hungary. Mérey became a member of the Vice-regency Council in 1542. He was appointed Chief Justice (Hungarian: királyi személynök) by Ferdinand I in 1544. He held that office until 1562, when he was elected Palatinal Governor (or Vice-palatine), after the death of Tamás Nádasdy. The office had only jurisdictional function, as the Hungarian magnates demanded restoring the office of the Palatine. The Emperor-King reigned Hungary over the Royal Governor.

Mérey was created Baron in 1563. He also functioned as Ispán (Count; comes) of Pest-Pilis-Solt-Kiskun County. During his tenure, he received substantial estate donations: he acquired, among others, Éberhárd Castle (today: Malinovo, Slovakia), and the large areas of Somogy and Trencsén Counties.

He participated in the development of the Quadripartium, which would have been the Corpus Juris of Hungary, however never became law. Mérey died in 1572. He was succeeded by Imre Czobor.

== Sources ==
- Markó, László: A magyar állam főméltóságai Szent Istvántól napjainkig – Életrajzi Lexikon p. 240. (The High Officers of the Hungarian State from Saint Stephen to the Present Days – A Biographical Encyclopedia) (2nd edition); Helikon Kiadó Kft., 2006, Budapest; ISBN 963-547-085-1.
- Bokor, József (ed.) Négyes könyv, A Pallas nagy lexikona. Arcanum, FolioNET Kft, 1998. ISBN 963 85923 2 X.

Political offices
| Preceded by Ferenc Révay | Chief justice 1544–1562 | Succeeded by János Zomor |
| Preceded by Tamás Nádasdy as Palatine | Palatinal Governor of Hungary; 1562–1572 | Succeeded by Imre Czobor |
