= Peter, Palatine of Hungary =

Hungarian noble

Peter

Palatine of Hungary
- Reign: fl. 1091
- Predecessor: Julius
- Successor: John

Peter (Hungarian: Péter) was a Hungarian noble in the late 11th century, who served as Palatine of Hungary around 1091, during the reign of Ladislaus I of Hungary.

He was appointed to the position sometime after 1089 or 1090, since his predecessor Julius is last mentioned in this capacity from those years. Peter's name appears only in the establishing charter of the Somogyvár Abbey in 1091. It is possible he is identical with that comes [palatinus?] Peter, who – alongside Marcellus – was sent by the ailing Ladislaus to Poland in order to negotiate with Sieciech, the deputy of Duke Władysław I Herman in the summer of 1095. The Hungarian delegation invited the king's exiled nephew Coloman back from Poland to become his heir.

== Sources ==
- Koszta, László (2003). "Marcell [Marcellus]". In Beke, Margit (ed.). Esztergomi érsekek 1001–2003 [Archbishops of Esztergom 1001–2003] (in Hungarian). Szent István Társulat. pp. 43–45. ISBN 963-361-472-4.
- Markó, László (2006). A magyar állam főméltóságai Szent Istvántól napjainkig: Életrajzi Lexikon [Great Officers of State in Hungary from King Saint Stephen to Our Days: A Biographical Encyclopedia] (in Hungarian). Helikon Kiadó. ISBN 963-547-085-1.
- Zsoldos, Attila (2011). Magyarország világi archontológiája, 1000–1301 [Secular Archontology of Hungary, 1000–1301] (in Hungarian). História, MTA Történettudományi Intézete. ISBN 978-963-9627-38-3.

Political offices
Preceded by Julius	Palatine of Hungary fl. 1091	Succeeded by John
