= Franciscus a Mesgnien Meninski =

Author of a Turkish-to-Latin dictionary and grammar (1623–1698)

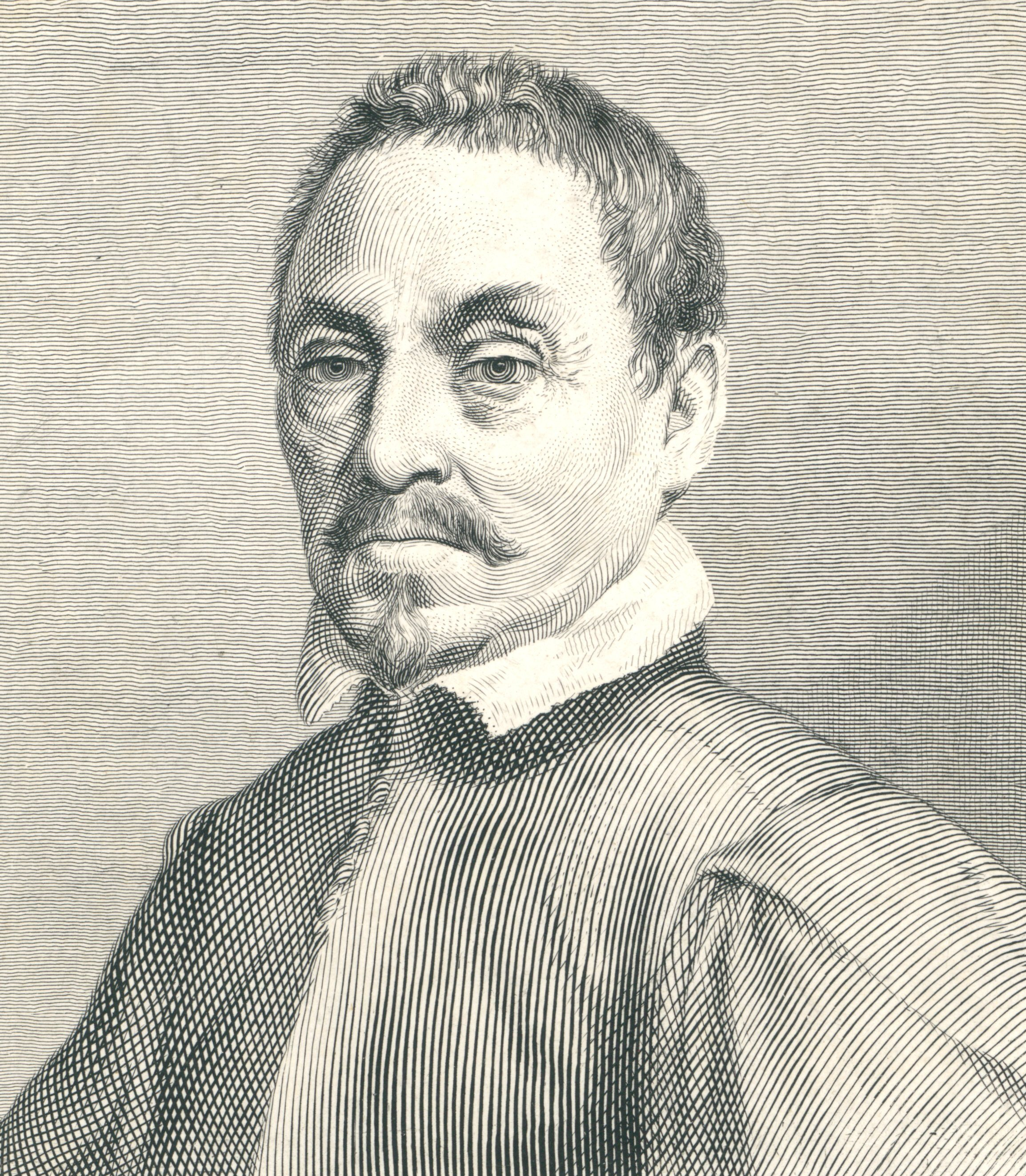
A portrait of the author of 'Thesaurus Linguarum Orientalium' by Antoni Oleszczyński (1794-1879), Polish engraver.

Franciscus à Mesgnien Meninski (first name spelled also Francisci, François and Franciszek) (1623–1698) was the author of a multi-volume Turkish-to-Latin dictionary and grammar of the Turkish language, first published in 1680, which was ground-breaking in its comprehensiveness at the time, and for historians and linguists today it is a valuable reference for the Turkish language of the early modern period.

Mesgnien-Meninski was born in the Duchy of Lorraine then in the Holy Roman Empire. He studied in Rome, where one of his teachers was a theoretical linguist, logician, and Jesuit, Giovanni Battista Giattini. Mesgnien-Meninski moved to the Polish-Lithuanian Commonwealth around 1647. In 1649, when aged in his late 20s, he published in Latin a grammar and tutorial for learning the Polish language. In 1653 at age 30 he accompanied the Polish ambassador to Istanbul. After two to three years of applying himself to the study of the Turkish language in Istanbul, he became the chief translator to the Polish embassy at Istanbul, and subsequently was appointed as deputy ambassador with full ambassadorial powers. Soon after that promotion, he was awarded Polish citizenship, on which occasion he added the Polish termination of "ski" to his last name, which had been Mesgnien or Menin previously. In 1661 he moved to Vienna in Austria to become interpreter of Oriental languages for the Habsburg monarchy at Vienna. He stayed at that post for the rest of his career, and died at Vienna.

His great work, the Thesaurus Linguarum Orientalium, Turcicæ, Arabicæ, Persicæ, was published at Vienna in 1680 in 4 volumes, consisting of a dictionary of Turkish, Arabic and Persian vocabulary translated to Latin and explained in Latin, plus a grammar and tutorial for learning the Turkish language. For his Arabic and Persian vocabulary Meninski copied much from the Arabic-Latin and Persian-Latin dictionaries of Jacobus Golius (died 1667). The Turkish was largely and essentially from Meninski himself. In 1687, Meninski published a complementary volume entitled Complementum Thesaurus Linguarum Orientalium, in which the Latin words are organized alphabetically and translated into Turkish.
