= Rodowan =

Hungarian Palatine and Nobleman

Palatine of Hungary
- Reign: 1067
- Predecessor: Otto Győr
- Successor: Julius
- Died: after 1071
- Noble family: gens Bogátradvány
- Father: Bogát

Rodowan (Latin: Rodoan, Hungarian: Radvány; fl. 1067—died after 1071) was a nobleman who served Solomon, the King of Hungary, as palatine (Latin: palatinus comes), the highest court title, around 1067.

== Career ==
He was the son of Bogát (Bagath or Bugar). He is an ancestor of the Bogát-Radvány family of Bohemia. His name, as well as that of his father, suggests that he was a Slav.

Rodowan acted as a testimony in 1067, when Peter Aba founded the Százd Abbey (laid near present-day Tiszakeszi) and donated his surrounding lands to the Benedictine monastery. Rodowan participated in the Byzantine–Hungarian War in 1071. He was present at the successful siege of Belgrade. According to the Illuminated Chronicle, Rodowan – alongside Vid Gutkeled and Bishop Franco – was one of those lords who advised Solomon to leave Duke Géza out of dividing the spoils of war, which caused the confrontation between them to deepen. Rodowan died sometime after 1071.

== Sources ==
=== Primary sources ===
- Bak, János M.; Veszprémy, László; Kersken, Norbert (2018). Chronica de gestis Hungarorum e codice picto saec. XIV [The Illuminated Chronicle: Chronicle of the deeds of the Hungarians from the fourteenth-century illuminated codex]. Budapest: Central European University Press. ISBN 978-9-6338-6264-3.

=== Secondary studies ===
- Markó, László (2006). A magyar állam főméltóságai Szent Istvántól napjainkig – Életrajzi Lexikon ("The High Officers of the Hungarian State from Saint Stephen to the Present Days – A Biographical Encyclopedia") (2nd edition); Helikon Kiadó Kft., Budapest; ISBN 963-547-085-1 (in Hungarian)
- Zsoldos, Attila (2011). Magyarország világi archontológiája, 1000–1301 ("Secular Archontology of Hungary, 1000–1301"). História, MTA Történettudományi Intézete. Budapest. ISBN 978-963-9627-38-3 (in Hungarian)

Political offices
Preceded by Otto Győr	Palatine of Hungary; 1067	Succeeded by Julius
