= John, son of Uros =

Hungarian lord

John

Palatine of Hungary
- Reign: 1108–1116
- Predecessor: Peter
- Successor: Fonsol
- Died: after 1116
- Father: Uros

John, son of Uros (or Janus, Hungarian: Uros fia János; died after 1116) was a Hungarian lord in the early 12th century, who served as Palatine of Hungary at least from 1108 to 1116, during the reigns of Coloman and Stephen II.

== Career ==
His father was Uros (also Urosa or Vrosa), who fought against the Germans, when the imperial army laid siege to Pressburg (present-day Bratislava, Slovakia) in the summer of 1052. The 14th-century Illuminated Chronicle mention him among the "brave warriors" during the siege.

John elevated into the dignity of Palatine of Hungary ("palatinus comes") during the reign of Coloman. He is first mentioned in this capacity, when he accompanied his king into Dalmatia, where Coloman confirmed the privileges of the city of Trogir in May 1108. He was also present, when Coloman returned to Zadar and reaffirmed the Dalmatian towns' – Split, Trogir and Zadar – liberties in 1111. John's presence in the escort of the monarch is also reflected by the two privilege letters of the Zobor Abbey, issued in 1111 and 1113. A handwritten note from the 14th-century Venetian source, Liber Pactorum mentions John's presence, when Coloman granted privileges to the island city of Rab (Arbe) at an unknown time, possibly in 1116.

== Battle of Olšava ==
The Bohemians wrought great devastation in the king's camp. However, Janus, son of Uros, the count palatine, who had taken up station at some distance from the king [Stephen II]; having heard [of this] he silently and swiftly armed his men and assaulted the Bohemians as they sacked the camp, and the hand of the Lord caused them to fall before the face of the sword of the Hungarians in terrible death. Janus sent a messenger after the king to tell him of the victory which the Lord had given him, and the king returned and rejoiced with exceeding great joy.

— Illuminated Chronicle

The newly crowned Stephen II initiated a meeting with Vladislaus I, Duke of Bohemia, in order to improve the countries' relations in 1116. The two monarchs met on the river Olšava, which marked the border of their realms. However, the lack of mutual confidence hindered the opening of negotiations, leading to armed conflicts which evolved into a battle on 13 May. While the contemporaneous Cosmas of Prague stated the Hungarians were heavily defeated, the Illuminated Chronicle claimed John's intervention saved the Hungarian army resulting Stephen's victory. Majority of the Hungarian historiography – e.g. Gyula Pauler, Bálint Hóman, Ferenc Makk and Gyula Kristó – accepts the authenticity of Cosmas, considering that the unidentified Hungarian chronicler, who wrote his text during the reign of Géza II or Stephen III, which later was utilized by the 14th-century chronicle composition (i.e. Illuminated Chronicle), included John' heroism as an afterthought beautification.

According to Zoltán Kordé, John led the vanguard consisted of Székelys and Pechenegs during the battle, and has achieved success against the Bohemians before leaving the battlefield. Thereafter, the Hungarian main army led by Stephen II suffered a defeat because of the imprudence of the king. György Szabados, however, accepted the reliability of the Hungarian chronicler who would have had no reason to keep silent about Stephen's defeat (since all subsequent kings descended from Álmos, Coloman's brother and rival). Szabados argued John used ancient steppe military tactics, when launched a surprise victorious charge with the light cavalry. Gergely Pandi considered it cannot be proven that John, who last appears as palatine in contemporary records in 1113, was actually alive during the Battle of Olšava. It is possible that the chronicler sought to make his news report more authentic with a real historical person.

== Signet ring ==
A golden signet ring near Besenyszög in Jász-Nagykun-Szolnok County was excavated in the late 19th century. The ring depicts a facing male portrait with a diadem and circular text "+IANVS". Archaeologists Géza Nagy and Mária Hlatky attributed the jewel, which was made in the early 12th century, to John, son of Uros. Based on the font of the text and size of the artefact, Zsuzsa Lovag, however, argued the signet ring originates from the first half of the 13th century, and it depicts the incumbent monarch – Andrew II or Béla IV –, instead of "Janus" or John.

== Sources ==
=== Primary sources ===
- Bak, János M.; Veszprémy, László; Kersken, Norbert (2018). Chronica de gestis Hungarorum e codice picto saec. XIV [The Illuminated Chronicle: Chronicle of the deeds of the Hungarians from the fourteenth-century illuminated codex]. Budapest: Central European University Press. ISBN 978-9-6338-6264-3.

=== Secondary sources ===
- Kordé, Zoltán (1991). "A székelyek a XII. századi elbeszélő forrásokban [Székelys in the 12th-century narrative sources]". Acta Universitatis Szegediensis de Attila József nominatae. Acta Historica (in Hungarian). 92. MTA-SZTE-MOL Magyar Medievisztikai Kutatócsoport: 17–24. ISSN 0324-6965.
- Lovag, Zsuzsa (1980). "Árpád-kori pecsétgyűrűk I. [Signet Rings from the Age of Árpáds, Vol. 1.]". Folia archeologica. 31. Hungarian National Museum – Népművelési Propaganda Iroda: 221–238. ISSN 0133-2023.
- Markó, László (2006). A magyar állam főméltóságai Szent Istvántól napjainkig: Életrajzi Lexikon [Great Officers of State in Hungary from King Saint Stephen to Our Days: A Biographical Encyclopedia] (in Hungarian). Helikon Kiadó. ISBN 963-547-085-1.
- Pandi, Gergely (2014). "Béketárgyalásból háború? Gondolatok az 1116. évi olšavai ütközethez [From Peace Negotiations to War? About the Battle of Olšava in 1116]". In Belucz, Mónika; et al. (eds.). Magister historiae (in Hungarian). Eötvös Loránd University. pp. 141–152. ISBN 978-963-284-527-2.
- Szabados, György (2007). "A régi magyar taktika Árpád-kori írott kútfőkben. A steppei eredetű harci műveltség nyomai és megjelenítése a XIII. század végéig [The Ancient Hungarian Tactics in the Written Sources of the Age of the Árpád Dynasty. Traces and Manifestations of the Warfare of the Steppes until the Late 13th Century]". Hadtörténelmi Közlemények (in Hungarian). 120 (2). Hadtörténeti Intézet és Múzeum: 475–500. ISSN 0017-6540.
- Szőcs, Tibor (2014). A nádori intézmény korai története, 1000–1342 [An Early History of the Palatinal Institution: 1000–1342] (in Hungarian). Magyar Tudományos Akadémia Támogatott Kutatások Irodája. ISBN 978-963-508-697-9.
- Zsoldos, Attila (2011). Magyarország világi archontológiája, 1000–1301 [Secular Archontology of Hungary, 1000–1301] (in Hungarian). História, MTA Történettudományi Intézete. ISBN 978-963-9627-38-3.

Political offices
Preceded by Peter	Palatine of Hungary; 1108–1116	Succeeded by Fonsol
