= Nicolaus Olahus =

Roman Catholic archbishop (1493–1568)

His Excellency Nicolaus Olahus
- Archbishop of Esztergom; Primate of Hungary
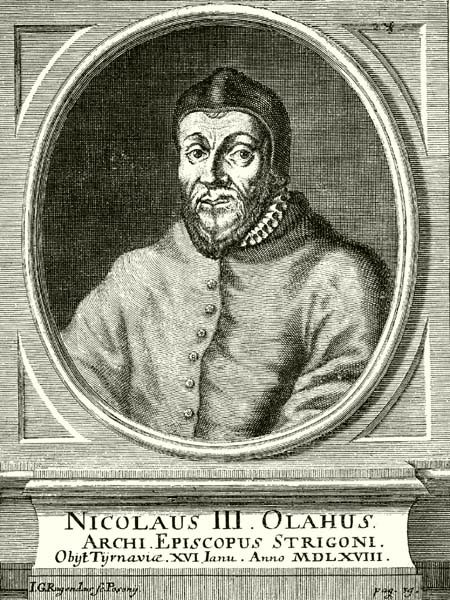
- See: Esztergom
- Appointed: 20 March 1553
- Term ended: 14 January 1568
- Predecessor: George Martinuzzi
- Successor: Antonio Veranzio
- Other post: Bishop of Eger

Personal details
- Born: 10 January 1493 Nagyszeben, Kingdom of Hungary (now Sibiu, Romania)
- Died: 14 January 1568 (aged 75) Pozsony, Kingdom of Hungary (now Bratislava, Slovakia)
- Parents: Stephanus Olahus; Barbara Huszár
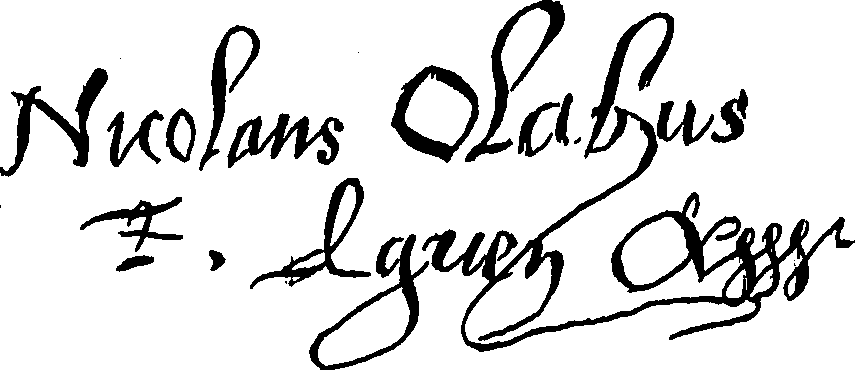
- Signature

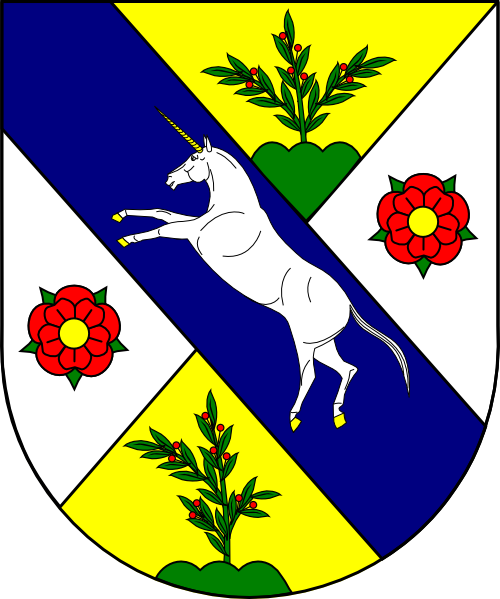
- Coat of arms

Nicolaus Olahus (Latin for Nicholas, the Vlach; Hungarian: Oláh Miklós; Romanian: Nicolae Valahul); 10 January 1493 – 15 January 1568) was the Archbishop of Esztergom, Primate of Hungary, and a distinguished Catholic prelate, humanist and historiographer.

== Early life ==
Nicolaus Olahus was born in Nagyszeben (now Sibiu, Romania). His father, Stephen (Hungarian: István, Romanian: Ștefan), a nephew of John Hunyadi, Voivode of Transylvania, was of Romanian descent from his father's side. Originally from the Principality of Wallachia, he was forced to flee to Hungary after his family entered in conflict with Prince Vlad Dracul. Olahus later used his Romanian origin to claim ties to the Roman Empire and Latin civilization. His mother was Barbara (Hungarian: Borbála) Huszár. He was a cousin of Matthias Corvinus and was also related to Vlad the Impaler.

His autobiographical notes and correspondence shed light about how he lived his life. After his studies at Chapter School of Várad (now Oradea, Romania) from 1505 to 1512, he became a page at the court of Ladislaus II. Shortly afterwards, he chose an ecclesiastical career, and was ordained a priest in 1516 or 1518.

While acting as secretary to George Szatmári, Bishop of Pécs, he was appointed a canon of that chapter. In 1522, he became the Archdeacon of Komárom. He was given a secretarial position to the King Louis II in 1526, but was transferred to the service of Mary of Habsburg later on. After the battle of Mohács, Olahus chose to side with the party of King Ferdinand I, but retained his position with the queen-dowager.

== High office ==
In 1527 he was appointed Custos or head of the Chapter of Székesfehérvár, and accompanied the queen-dowager in 1530 to the Imperial Diet at Augsburg. When in 1531 she became Governor of the Netherlands, he went with her to what is today Belgium, where he remained (with a brief interruption in 1539) until his return to Hungary in 1542. Queen Mary had invited Erasmus to settle in Brabant. It was there that Olahus met him, and they kept up a correspondence. In 1543 Olahus was made Royal Chancellor and Bishop of Agram (Zagreb) by King Ferdinand.

In 1548 he became Bishop of Eger, and in 1553 Archbishop of Esztergom. As such, he crowned Maximilian King of Hungary, and performed the solemn obsequies (1563) over Ferdinand I. As Archbishop of Esztergom, Olahus's first care was to put order into the finances and property of the archdiocese. He enforced yet again the Jus Piseti, i.e. the right of supervision over the mint at Körmöcbánya (present-day Kremnica, Slovakia), for which surveillance the archdiocese enjoyed a large revenue. At his own expense, he redeemed the hypothecated provostship of Turóc (present-day Turiec, Slovakia), also the encumbered possessions of the Diocese of Nyitra (present-day Nitra, Slovakia). As Archbishop of Esztergom, Olahus exercised a supervision over the Diocese of Eger, and (with the consent of the Holy See) administered the Archdiocese of Kalocsa, vacant for 20 years. After the capture of Esztergom by the Ottomans, the new archiepiscopal residence was moved to either Nagyszombat or Pozsony.

== Activities ==
Olahus was particularly active in the Counter-Reformation; even before his elevation to the Archbishopric of Esztergom, he had been a very zealous opponent of the new Protestant teachings. As Primate of Hungary he threw himself with renewed energy into the conflict, aiming especially at the restoration of ecclesiastical discipline, the reformation of the clergy, and the establishment of new schools. The mountain cities of Upper Hungary, in which the doctrines of the Reformation had made considerable progress, attracted his particular attention.

He organized a visitation of the archdiocese, which he in great part conducted in person, besides convoking, with a similar intention, a number of diocesan synods. The first of these synods was held in 1560 at Nagyszombat; during its closing session he promulgated a code of dogmatic and moral instructions, intended for the clergy, published during that and the following year. In 1561 a provincial synod was held, likewise at Nagyszombat, to discuss the participation of the bishops of Hungary in the Council of Trent, which had just re-convened. While it is not certain whether Olahus took part in the Council, or if he promulgated in Hungary its decrees of 1562 and 1564, it is known that he followed its deliberations with close attention and put in practice some of its decisions.

In 1563 Olahus submitted to the council a lengthy memorial, in which he urged the importance of dealing with the critical situation of the Hungarian Church and describing in strong language the efforts he had made to overcome the demoralization that had seized on the clergy. It was particularly through school reform and the proper instruction of youth that he hoped to offset the progress of the Reformation. He restored the Cathedral school at Esztergom, which had fallen into decay when the city had been captured by the Turks; he transferred it, however, to his archiepiscopal city of Nagyszombat and confided it to the Jesuits, whom he invited to Hungary in 1561, and who, through their preaching and spiritual ministry, profoundly influenced the religious life of the nation.

Among the publications initiated by Olahus were the Breviarium Ecclesiæ Strigoniensis (1558), and the Ordo et Ritus Ecclesiæ Strigoniensis (1560). The revival of the custom of ringing the Angelus was due to him. As chancellor and confidant of Ferdinand I, Olahus possessed much political influence. In 1562 he acted as Regent. He was a diligent writer.

== Writings ==
- Hungaria et Atila, sive De originibus gentis, regni Hungariae situ, habitu, opportunitatibus et rebus bello paceque ab Atila gestis libri duo/ Nicolai Olahi
- Nicolai Olahi metropolitae Strigoniensis Hungaria et Attila sive de originibus gentis regni Hungariae [...] emondato coniumctim editi. Edited, annotated and republished by Adam F. Kollár. Vienna: 1763
- Genesis filiorum Regis Ferdinandi
- Ephemerides
- Brevis descriptio vitæ Benedicti Zerchsky

== See also ==
- Melchior Cibinensis

== Sources ==
- Markó, László: A magyar állam főméltóságai Szent Istvántól napjainkig – Életrajzi Lexikon (The High Officers of the Hungarian State from Saint Stephen to the Present Days – A Biographical Encyclopedia) (2nd edition); Helikon Kiadó Kft., 2006, Budapest; ISBN 963-547-085-1

Catholic Church titles
Preceded by Simon Erdődy	Bishop of Zagreb; 1543–1547	Succeeded by Farkas Gyulay
Preceded by George Martinuzzi	Archbishop of Esztergom; 20 March 1553 – 14 January 1568	Succeeded by Antonio Veranzio
