= Hungarian literature =

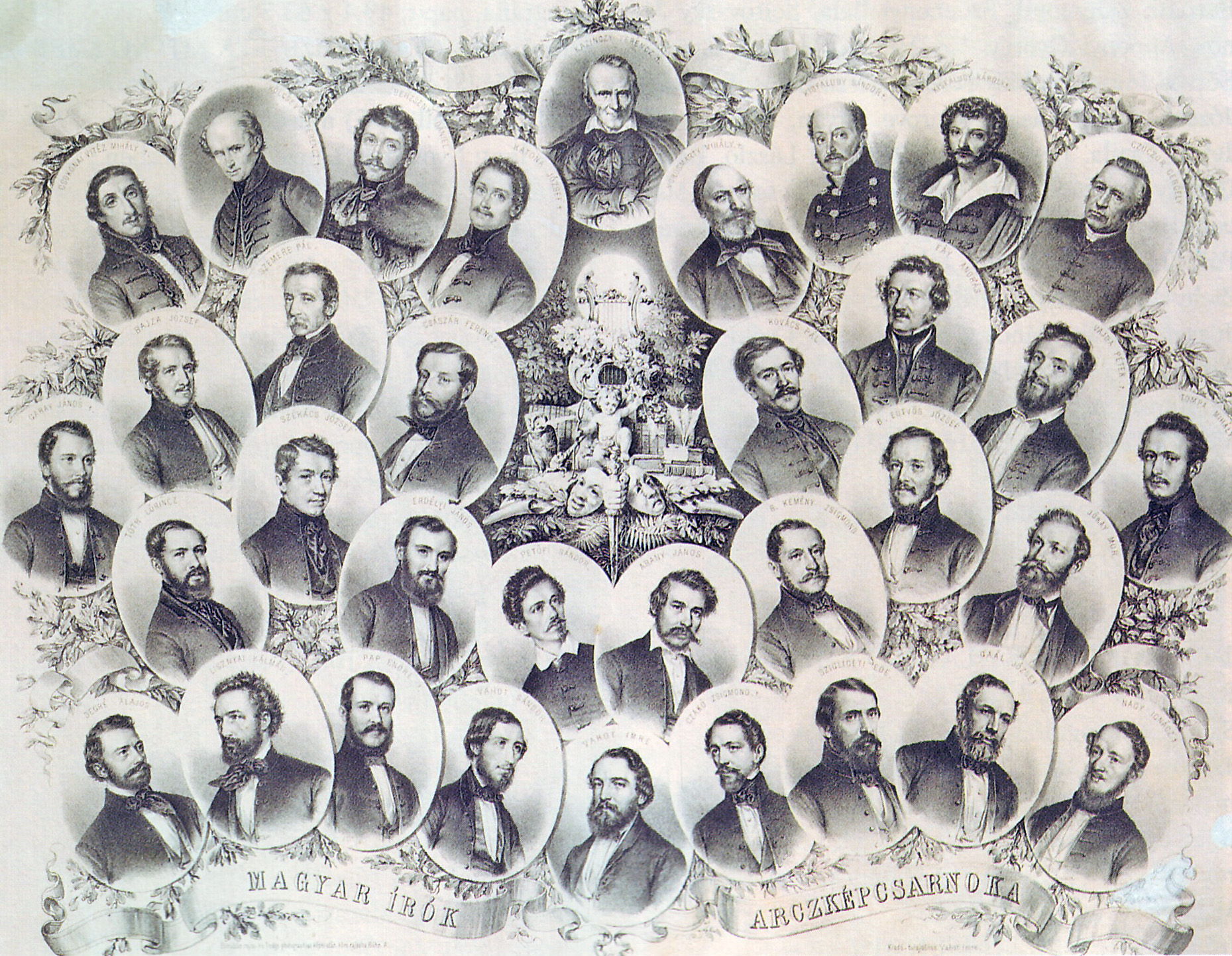
The greatest authors and poets in the Hungarian literature of the 19th century

Hungarian literature is the body of written works primarily produced in Hungarian, and may also include works written in other languages (mostly Latin), either produced by Hungarians or having topics which are closely related to Hungarian culture. While it was less known in the English-speaking world for centuries, Hungary's literature gained renown in the 19th and 20th centuries, thanks to a new wave of internationally accessible writers like Mór Jókai, Antal Szerb, Sándor Márai, Imre Kertész and Magda Szabó.

== Earliest writings in the 10th-14th century ==
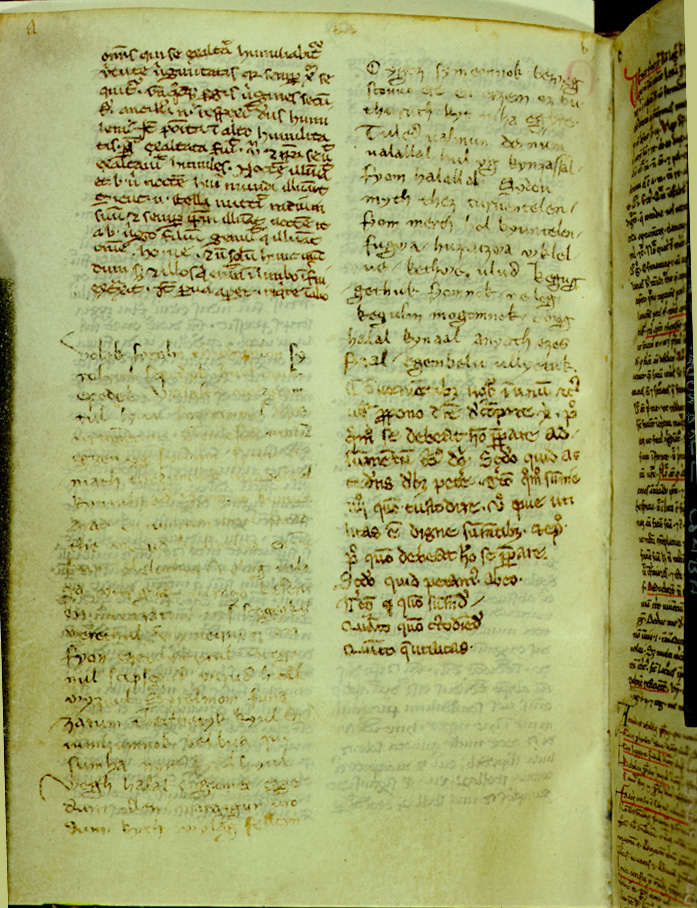
The oldest surviving poem of Hungarian language, Old Hungarian Laments of Mary

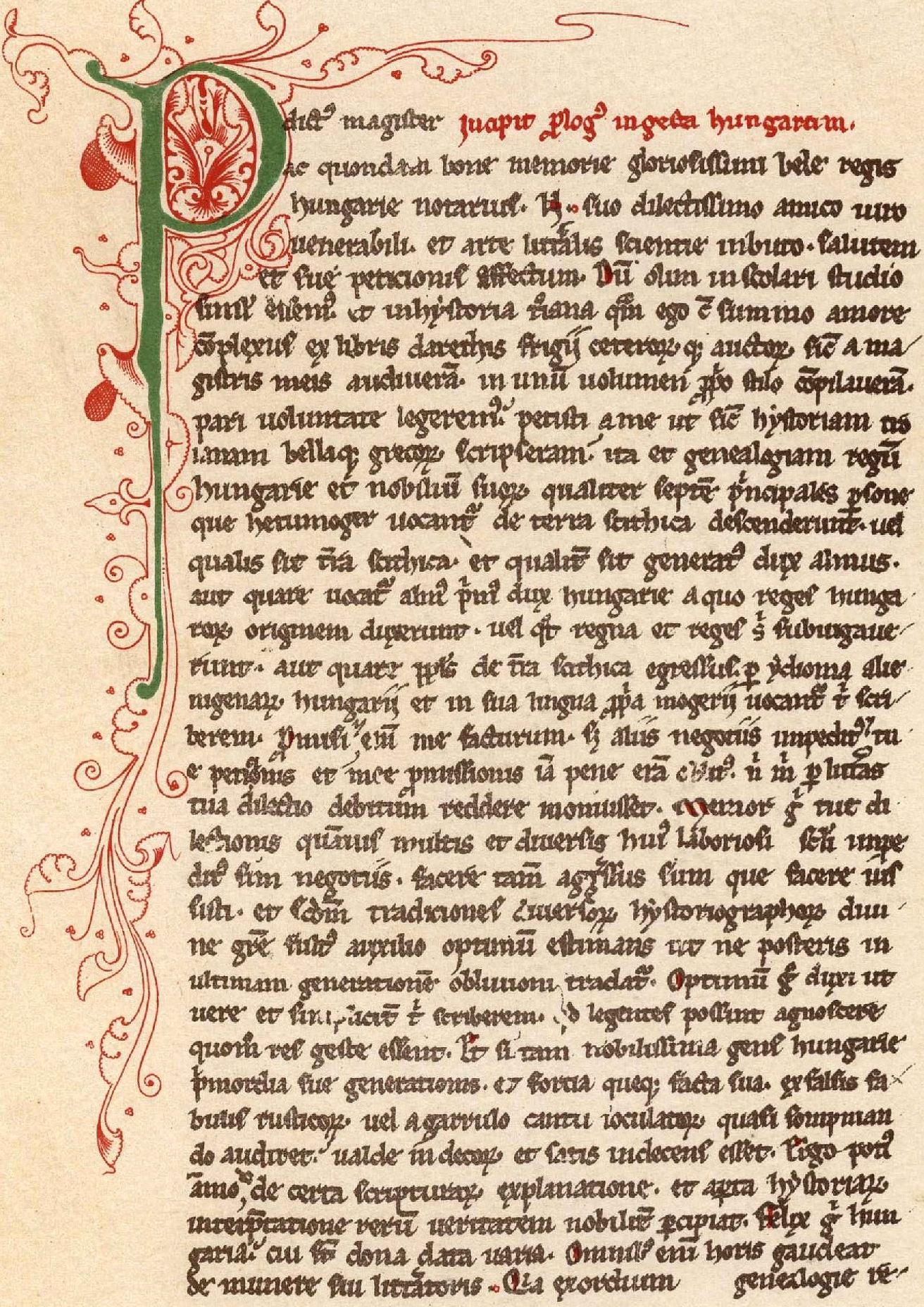
Gesta Hungarorum

The Illuminated Chronicle from the court of King Louis the Great of Hungary from 1358

The beginning of the history of Hungarian language as such (the proto-Hungarian period) is set at 1000 BC, when according to current theory, the language had become differentiated from its closest relatives, the Ob-Ugric languages. No written evidence remains of the earliest Hungarian literature, but through folktales and folk songs, elements have survived that can be traced back to pagan times. Also extant, although only in Latin and dating from between the 11th and 14th centuries, are shortened versions of some Hungarian legends relating the origins of the Hungarian people and episodes from the conquest of Hungary and from campaigns of the 10th century.

In earliest times the Hungarian language was written in a runic-like script, although it was not used for literary purposes in the modern sense. The country switched to the Latin alphabet after being Christianized under the reign of Stephen I (1000–1038). There are no existing documents from the pre-11th century era. The Old Hungarian period is reckoned from 896 CE, when Hungarians conquered the Carpathian Basin, settled down and started to build their own state. Creation of the first extant written records followed soon after. The oldest written record in Hungarian is a fragment in the Establishing charter of the abbey of Tihany (1055) which contains several Hungarian terms, among them the words feheruuaru rea meneh hodu utu rea, ("up the military road to Fehérvár," referring to the place where the abbey was built). This text is probably to be read as Fehérü váru reá meneü hodu utu reá with today's spelling, and it would read as a Fehérvárra menő had[i] útra in today's Hungarian. The rest of the document was written in Latin.

The oldest complete, continuous text in Hungarian is Halotti beszéd és könyörgés, a short funeral oration written in about 1192–1195, moving in its simplicity. The oldest poem is Ómagyar Mária-siralom (the Lamentations of Mary), a free translation from Latin of a poem by Godefroy de Breteuil. It is also the oldest surviving Uralic poem. Both the funeral sermon and the Lamentations are hard to read and not quite comprehensible for modern-day Hungarians, mostly because the 26-letter Latin alphabet was not sufficient to represent all the sounds in Hungarian before diacritic marks and double letters were added.

During the Middle Ages and well into the Renaissance, the language of writing was mostly Latin. Important documents include the Admonitions of St. Stephen, which includes the king's admonitions to his son Prince Imre.

Among the first chronicles about Hungarian history were Gesta Hungarorum ("Deeds of the Hungarians") by Anonymus, and Gesta Hunnorum et Hungarorum ("Deeds of the Huns and the Hungarians") by Simon Kézai. Both are in Latin. These chronicles mix history with legends, so historically they are not always authentic. Another chronicle is the Chronicon Pictum ("Illustrated Chronicle"), which was written for King Louis the Great by Mark of Kalt in 1358.

Further, Rogerius's 13th-century work was published with Thuróczy chronicle in the late 15th century. In Split (now a part of Croatia) Thomas of Spalato wrote on local history, with much information on Hungary in the 13th century. At that time Dalmatia and the city of Split were part of the Kingdom of Hungary.

== Renaissance and Baroque during the 15th-17th centuries ==
The 15th century saw the first translations from the Bible. Two Transylvanian preachers, Thomas and Valentine, followers of the Bohemian religious reformer Jan Hus, were responsible for this work, of which the prophetic books, the Psalms, and the Gospels have survived. A great part of the vocabulary created for the purpose is still in use.

Renaissance literature flourished under the reign of King Matthias (1458–1490). Janus Pannonius, although he wrote in Latin, counts as one of the most important persons in Hungarian literature, being the only significant Hungarian humanist poet of the period.

The Buda Chronicle was published in 1473, it was produced by András Hess in Buda, and is the first incunabulum ever printed in Hungary. Thus, the year 1473 is considered the beginning of Hungarian book printing. The Chronica Hungarorum from the Hess printing house in Buda is unprecedented in Europe in the 15th century, because no other country's history of printing begins with the publication of a folk's history. This is the first example, that the printing history of a country begin with the publication of the history of a people. The Hungarian book printing preceded England, Spain, and Austria. In fact, the number of printing houses was not too high at that time. At the end of the 1470s, 66 printing houses could operate in Europe, of which two were in the Kingdom of Hungary (in Buda and Pozsony (now Bratislava)).

In 1526 most of Hungary fell under Ottoman occupation, from which date the beginning of the Middle Hungarian period is set, in connection with various cultural changes. The most important poets of the period were Bálint Balassi (1554–1594), Sebestyén Tinódi Lantos (c. 1510–1556) and Miklós Zrínyi (1620–1664). Balassi's poetry shows Mediaeval influences. His poems can be divided into three thematic categories: love poems, war poems and religious poems. Zrínyi's most significant work, Szigeti veszedelem ("Peril of Sziget", 1648/49) is an epic written in the style of the Iliad, and recounts the heroic Battle of Szigetvár, where his great-grandfather died while defending the castle of Szigetvár.

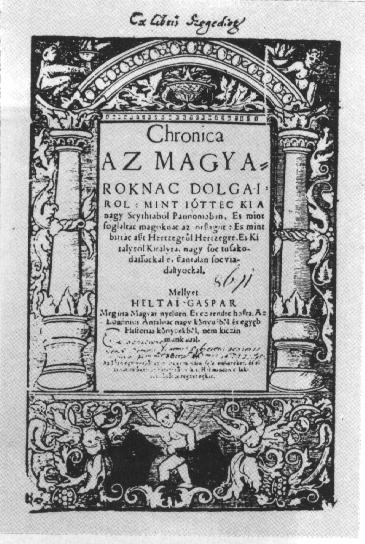
The cover of a Hungarian book from the time: Gáspár Heltai's "Chronicle about the affairs of the Magyars"

Translation of Roman authors produced also some works: János Baranyai Decsi translated Sallust's Catalina and Jughurta's war in the late 16th century. A decade later appeared the translation of Curtius Rufus's life of Alexander in Debrecen.

Historical works were even more numerous: the chronicle of Gáspár Heltai, published by him in Kolozsvár; Zay Ferenc's unpublished work on the siege of Belgrade from the 15th century; Kemény János's Transylvanian Dukes, and Miklós Bethlen's memoirs with János Szalárdy's voluminous then-unpublished work on Transylvanian history from Bethlen's reign to the 1660s; and Mihály Cserei's early 18th-century work are highlights of Hungarian-language literature. Another category is historical verses in Hungarian, like that of Sebestyén Tinódi Lantos from the 16th century, Péter Ilosvai Selymes, Mihály Szabatkai and Gergely Bornemissza.

Latin works in the period are more numerous. István Szamosközy, János Baranyai Decsi, Miklós Istvánffy, János Bethlen, and Farkas Bethlen, Ferenc Forgách, György Szerémi, Ambrus Somogyi, Gianmichele Bruto and Oláh Miklós are the most important authors of historical works from the 16th to 17th century. In German Georg Kraus and Georg Zeiler wrote on Transylvanian history. In Spanish one may read Bernardo de Aldana's apology for the 1552 loss of the castle of Lippa to the Turks.

Among religious literary works the most important is the Bible translation by Gáspár Károli, the Protestant pastor of Gönc, in 1590. The translation is called the Bible of Vizsoly, after the town where it was first published. Another important religious work is the Legend of Saint Margaret, copied by Lea Ráskai around 1510 from an earlier work that did not survive.

== Enlightenment and the language reform ==
The first Enlightenment writers in Hungary were Maria Theresia's bodyguards (György Bessenyei, János Batsányi and so on). The greatest poets of the time were Mihály Csokonai Vitéz and Dániel Berzsenyi.

The most prominent figure of Hungarian language reform was Ferenc Kazinczy, who helped make the Hungarian language a useful tool for scientific theorization; many new words were coined for describing new inventions, for example, mozdony (locomotive). Previously, the loanword lokomotív had been used.

== Gallery ==
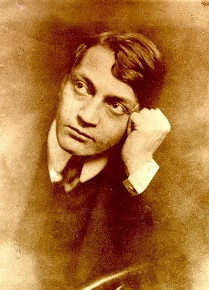
Endre Ady

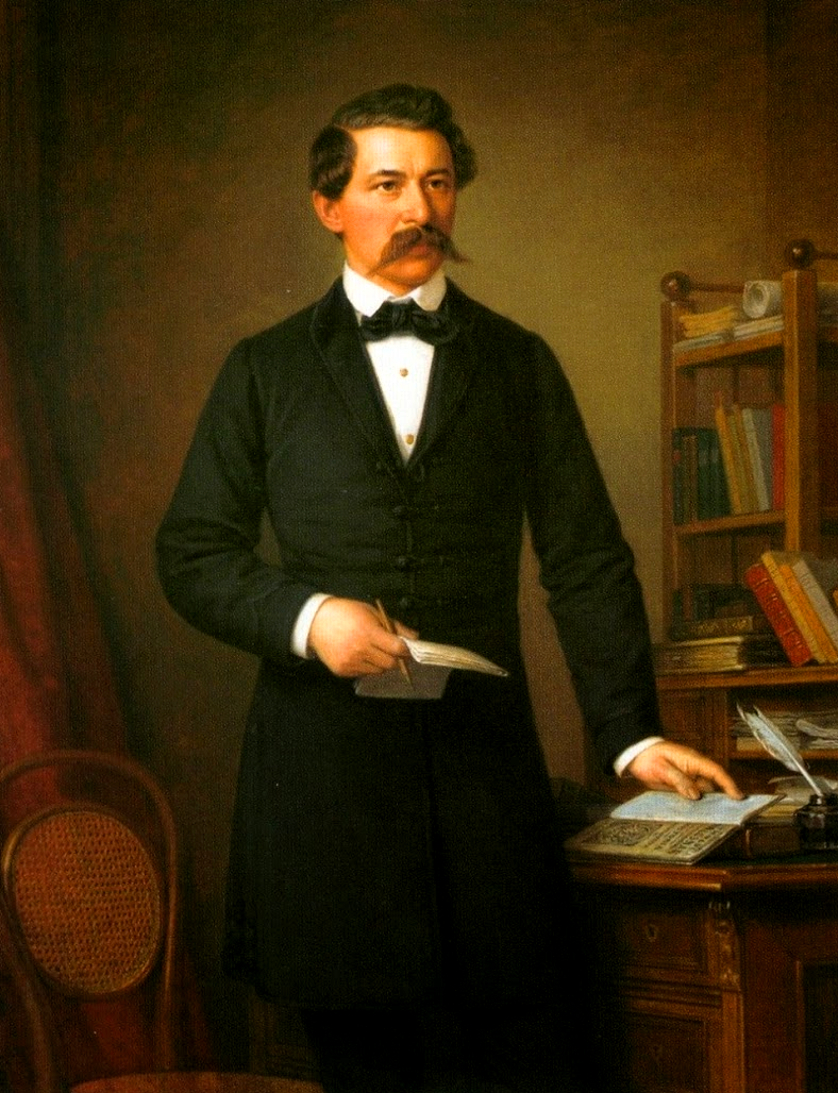
János Arany

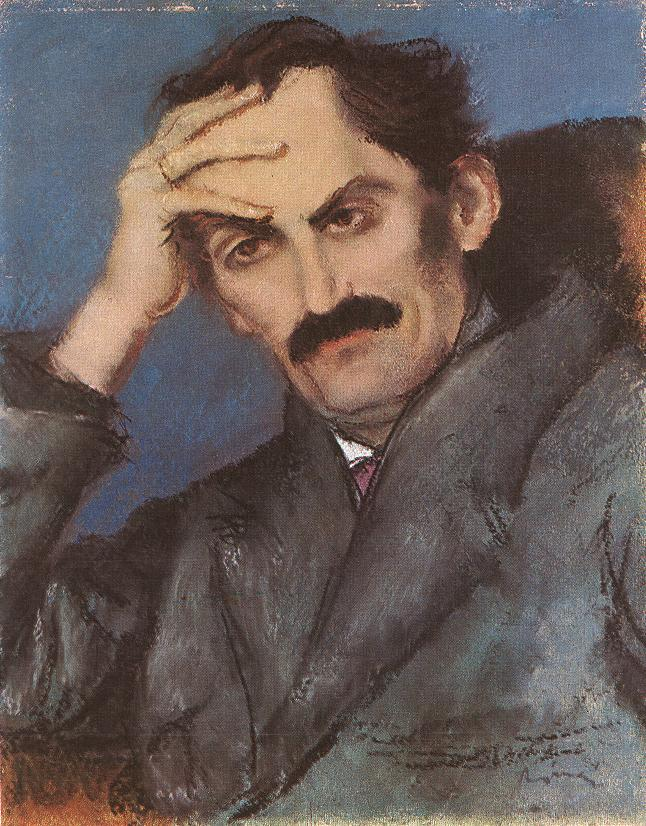
Mihály Babits

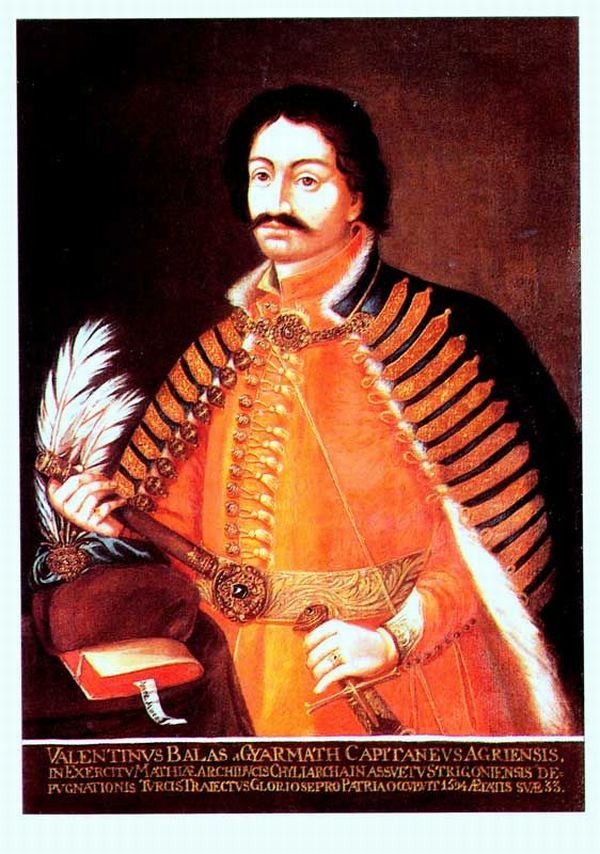
Bálint Balassi

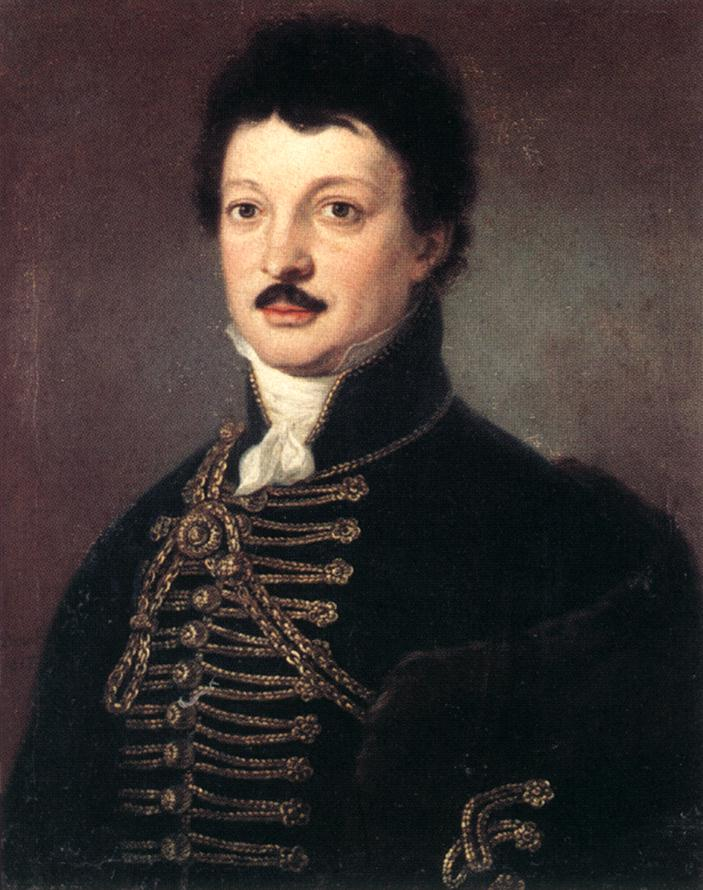
Dániel Berzsenyi

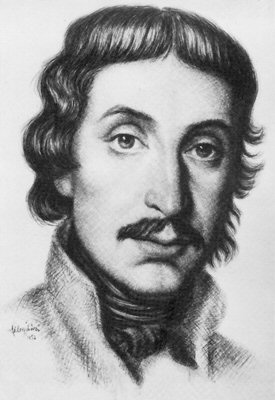
Mihály Csokonai Vitéz

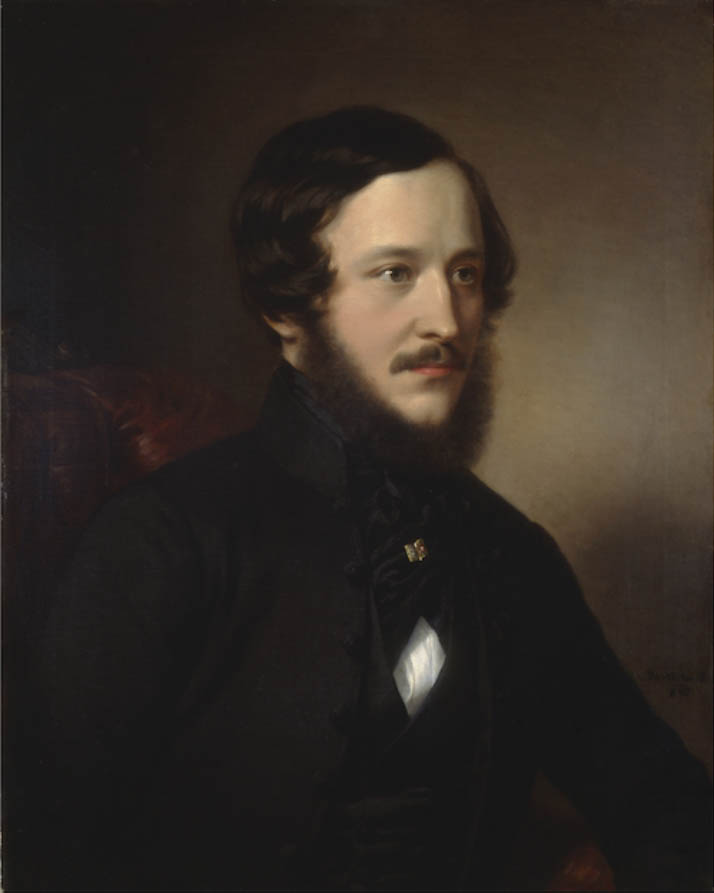
József Eötvös

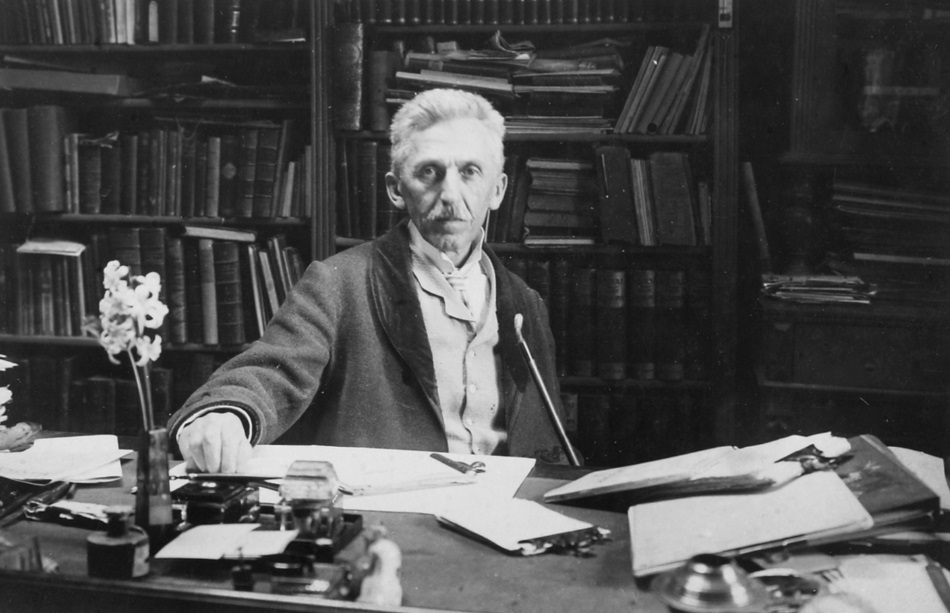
Géza Gárdonyi

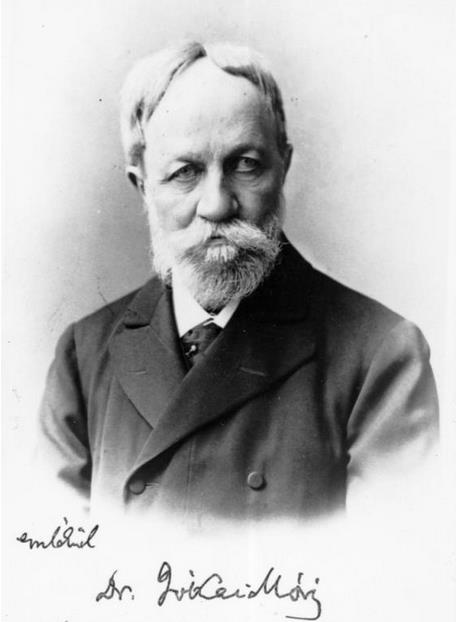
Mór Jókai

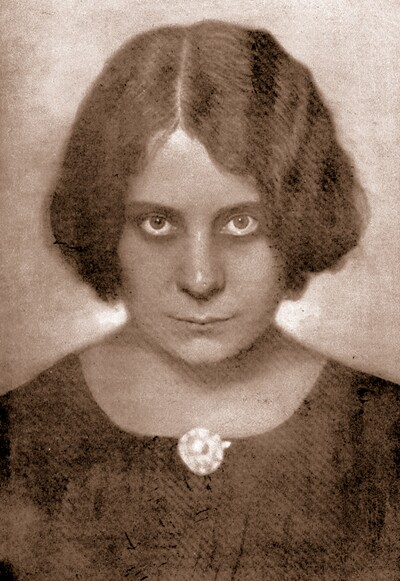
Margit Kaffka

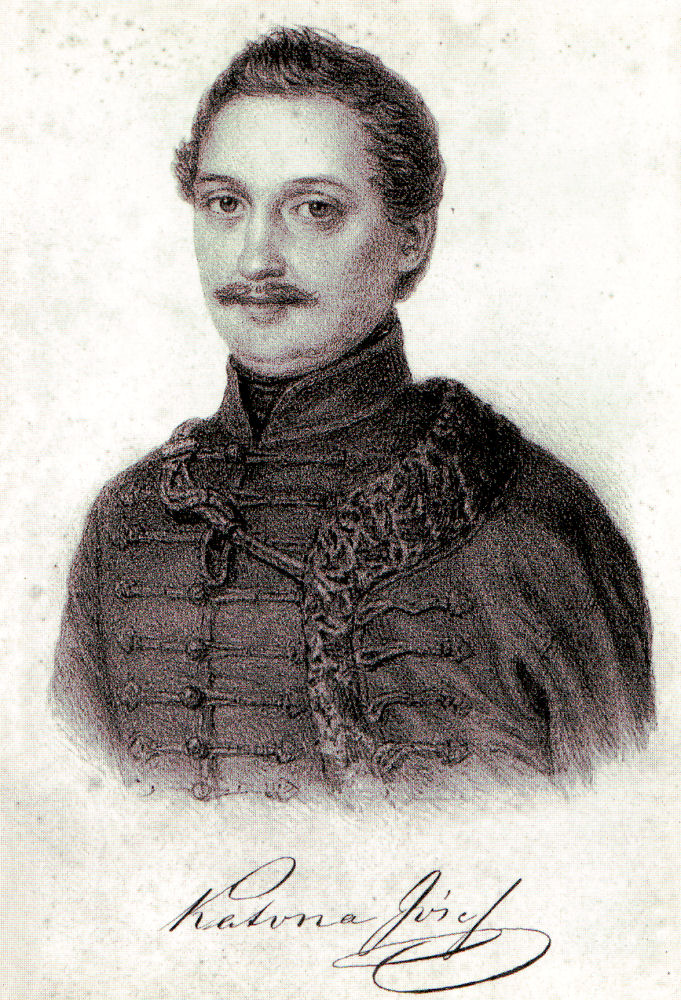
József Katona

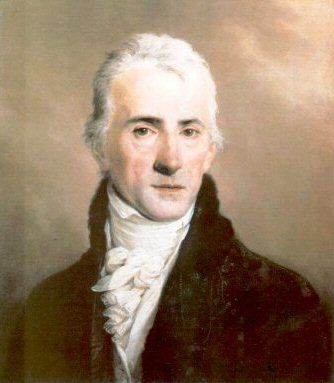
Ferenc Kazinczy

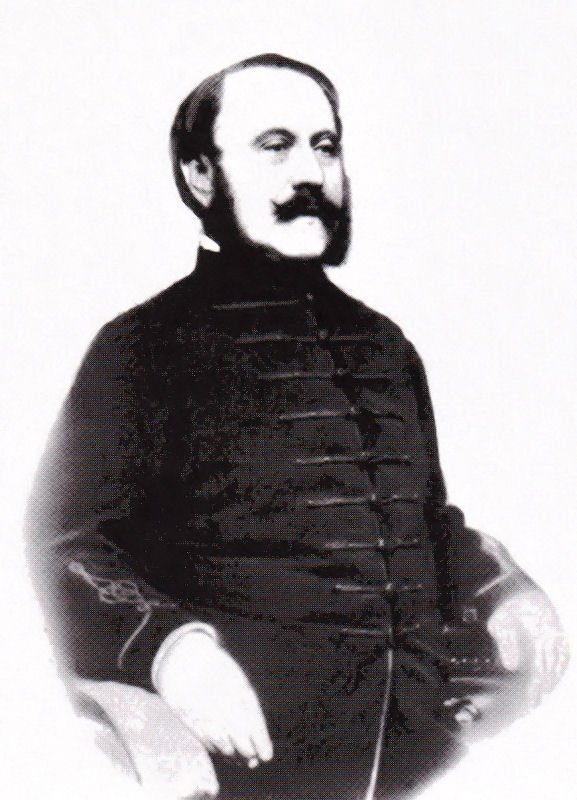
Zsigmond Kemény

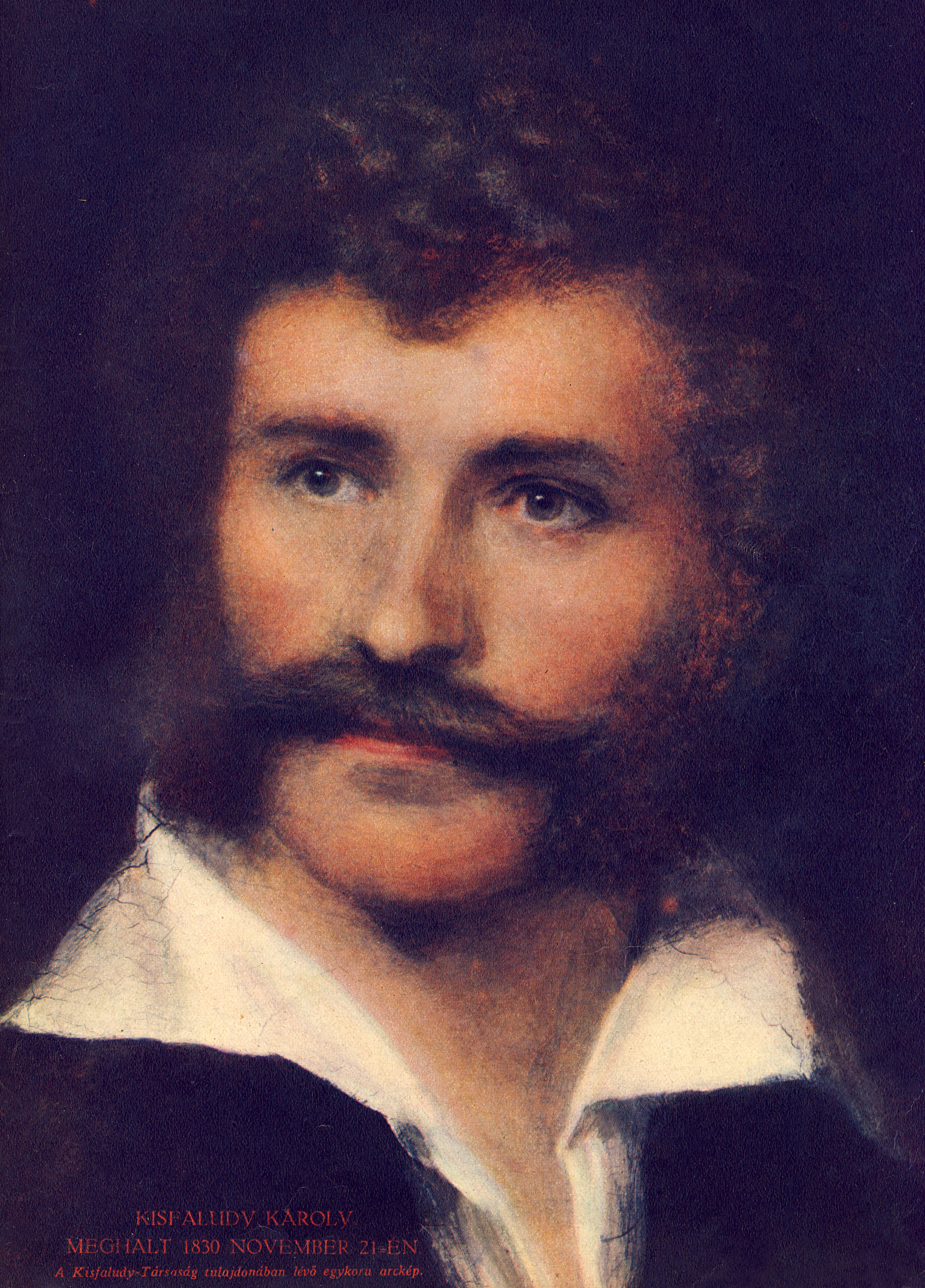
Károly Kisfaludy

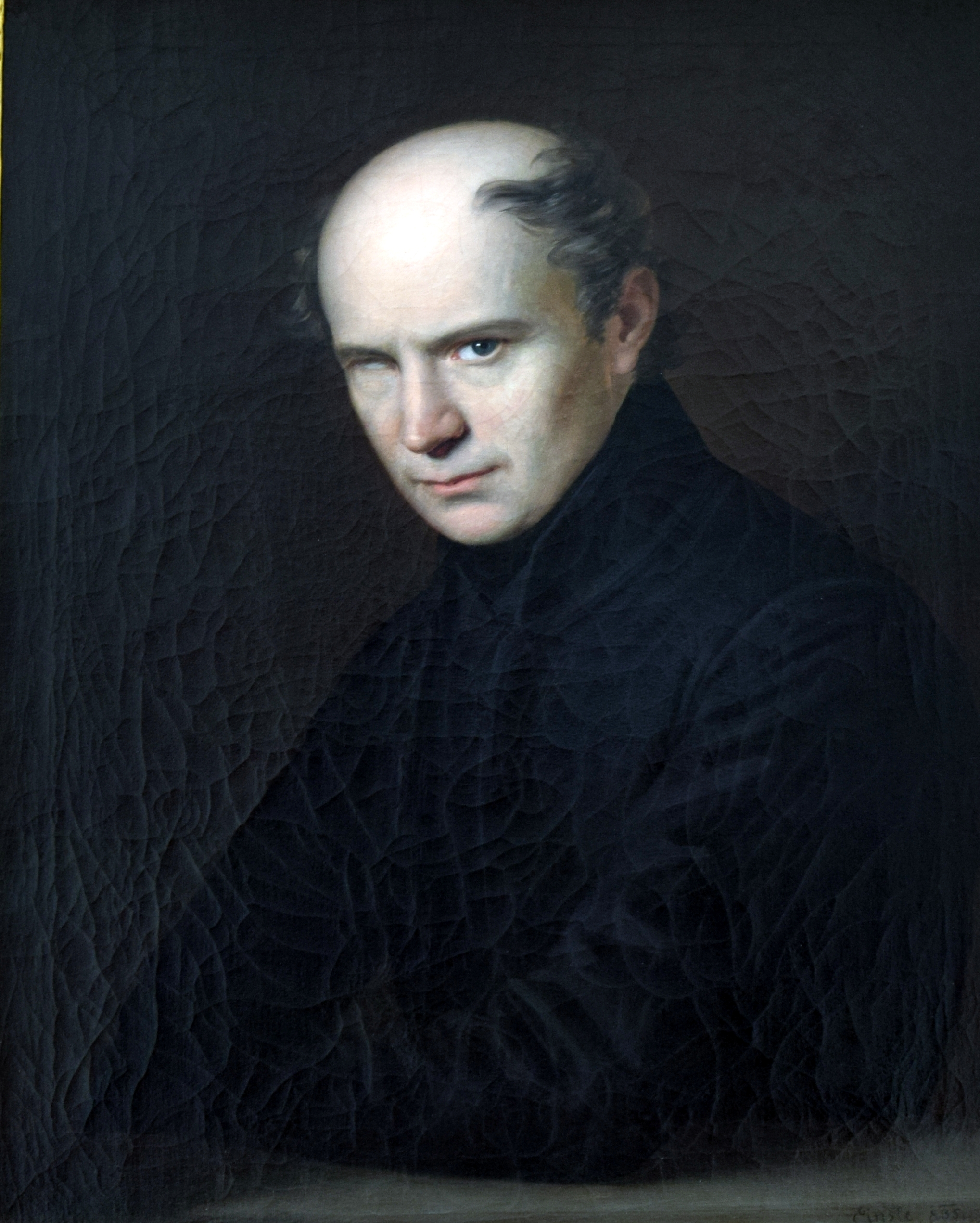
Ferenc Kölcsey

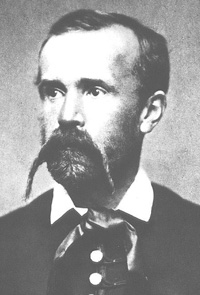
Imre Madách

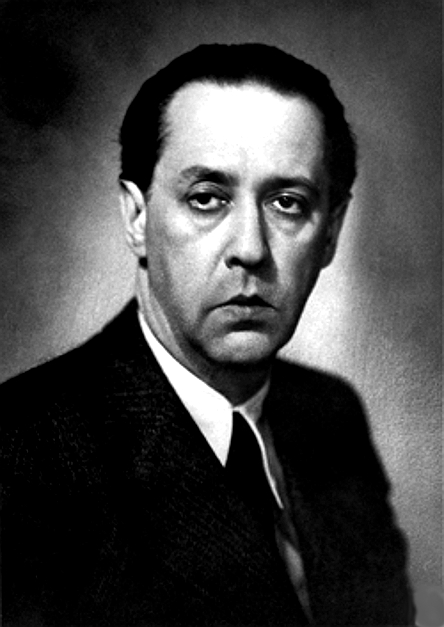
Sándor Márai

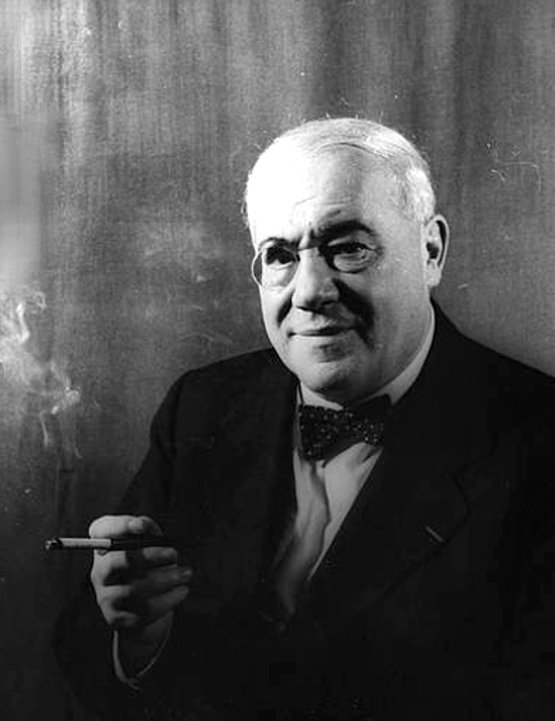
Ferenc Molnár

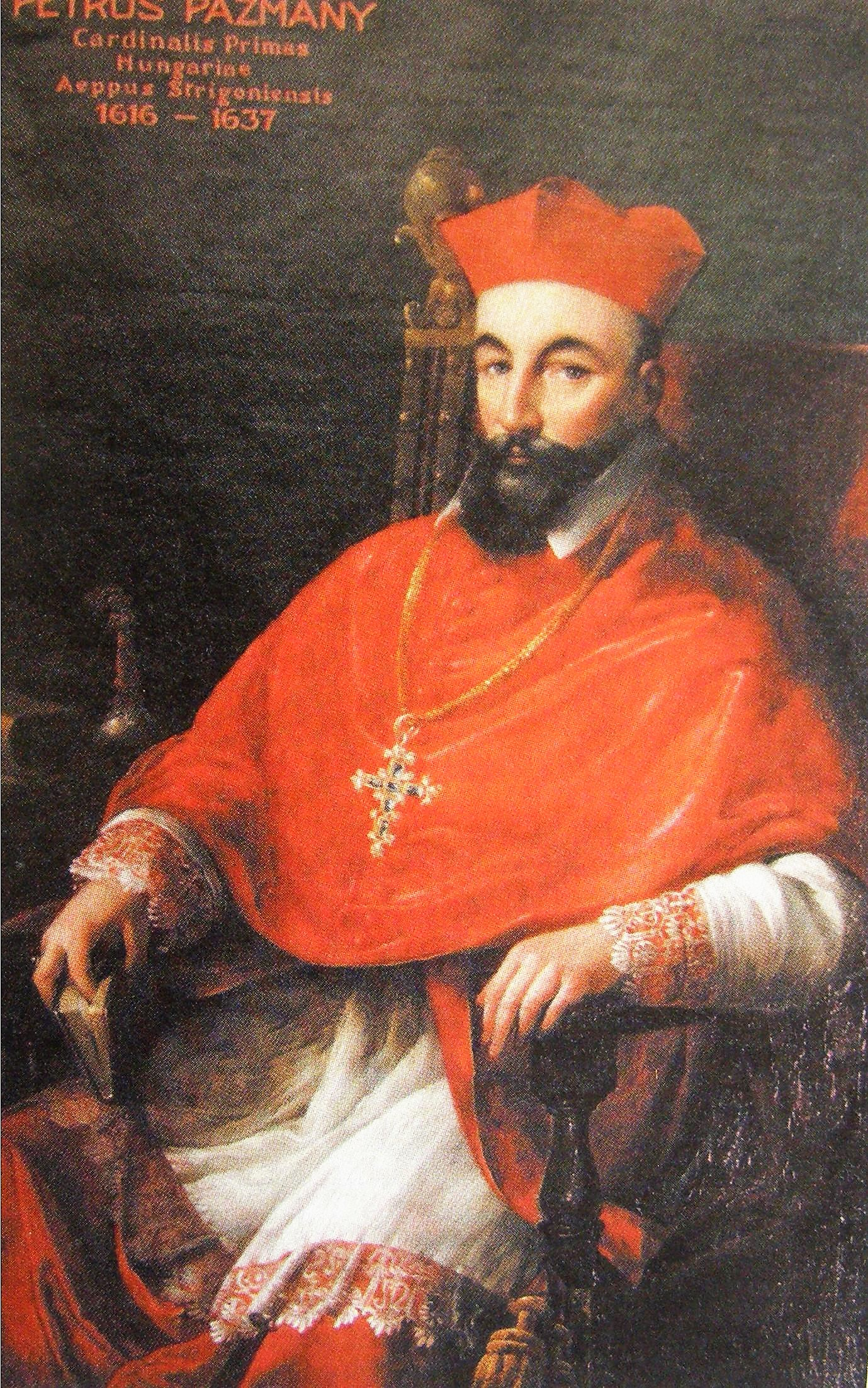
Péter Pázmány

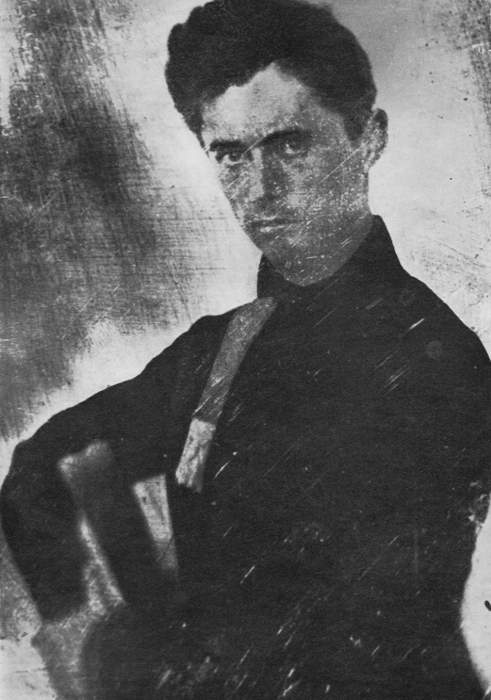
Sándor Petőfi

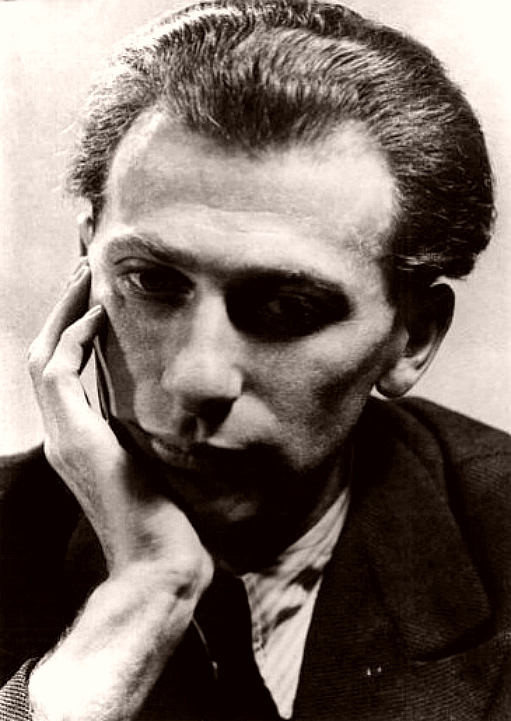
Miklós Radnóti

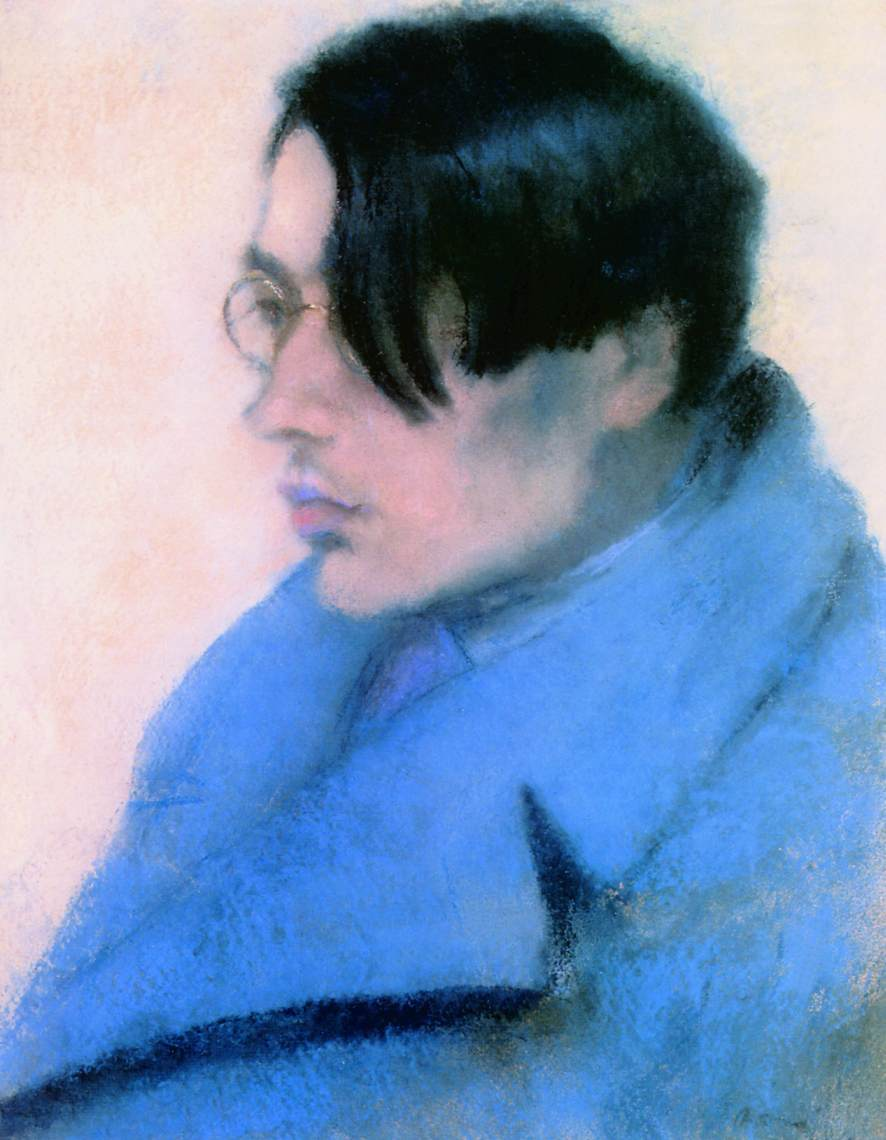
Lőrinc Szabó

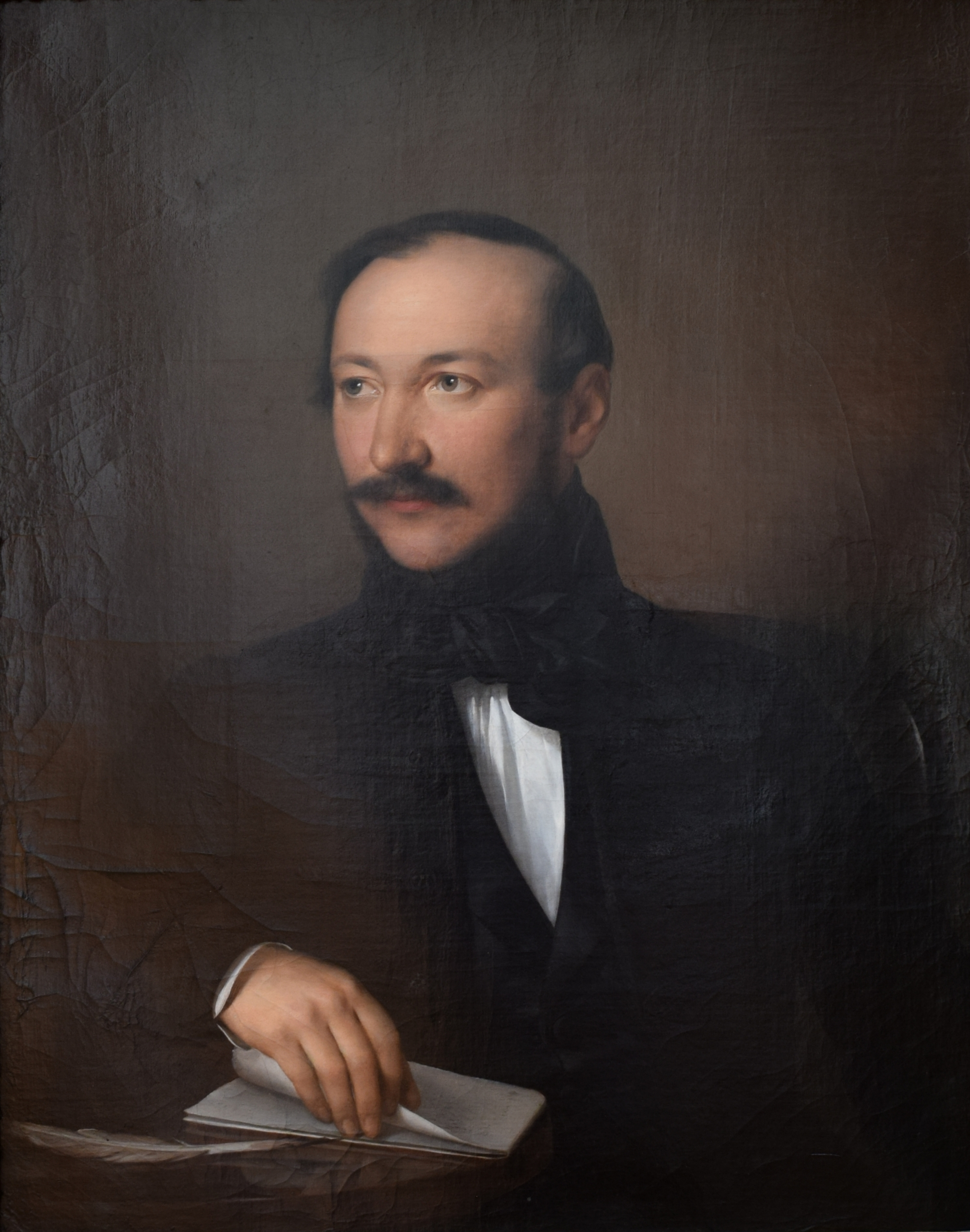
Mihály Vörösmarty

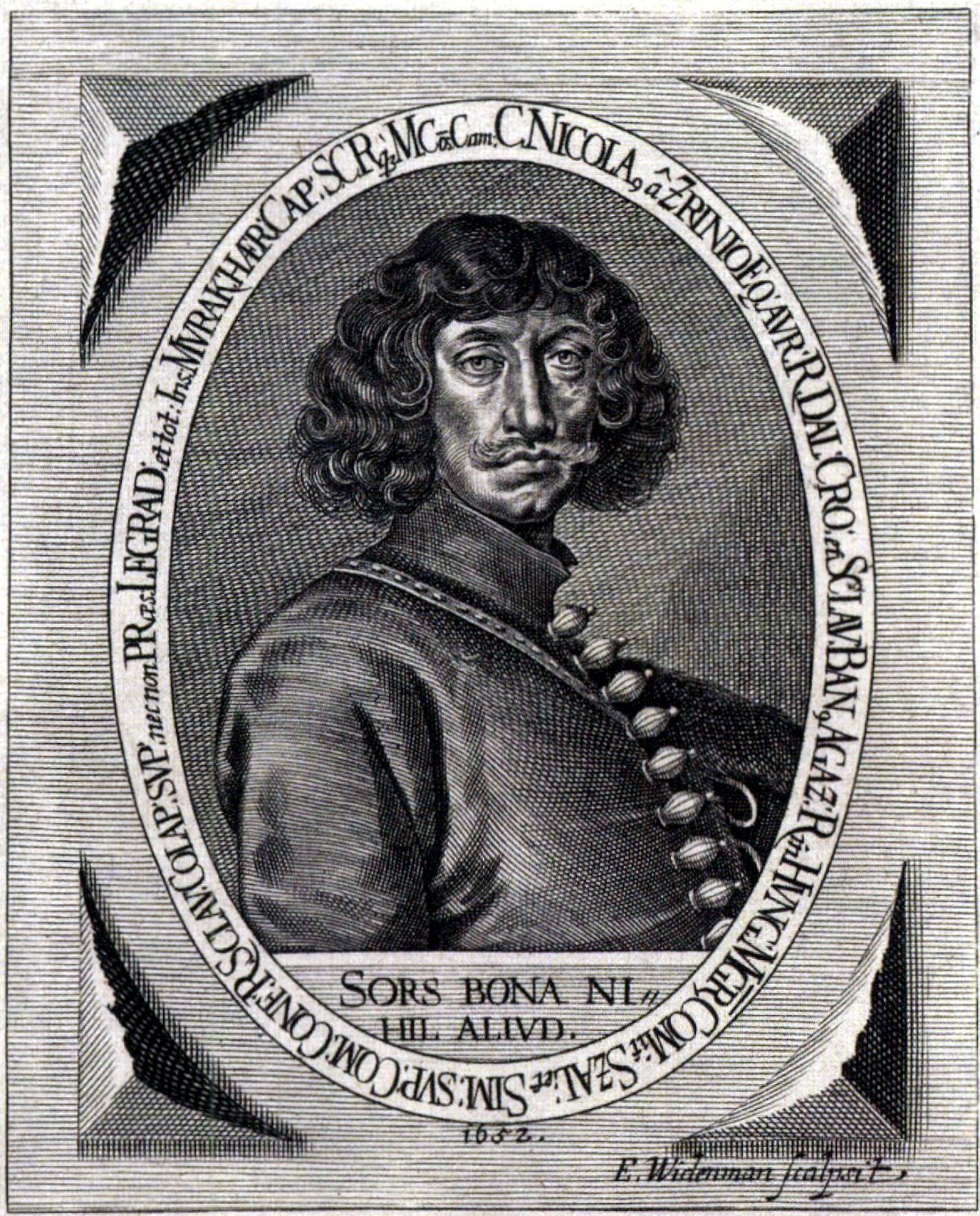
Miklós Zrínyi

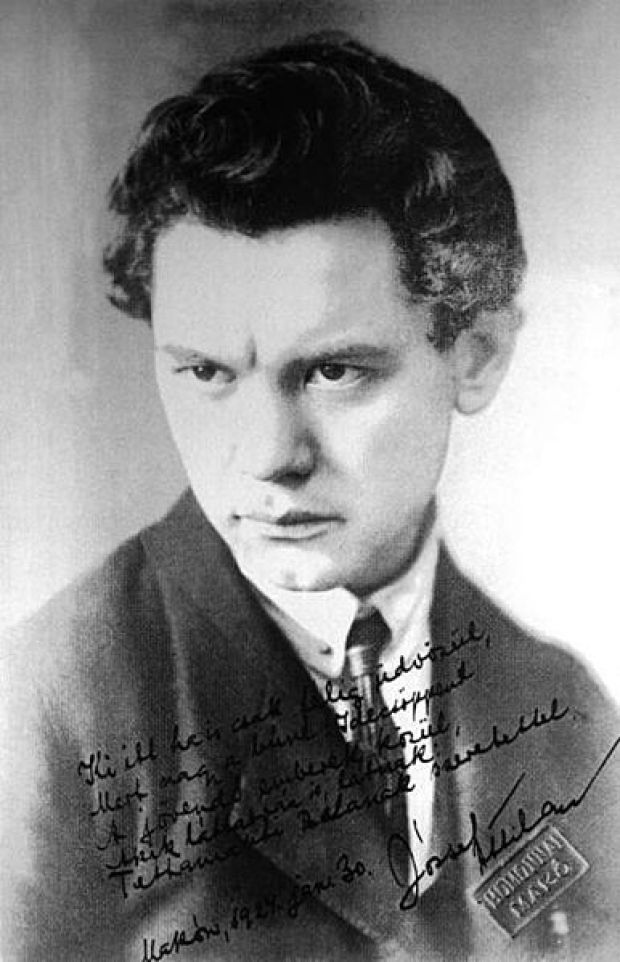
Attila József

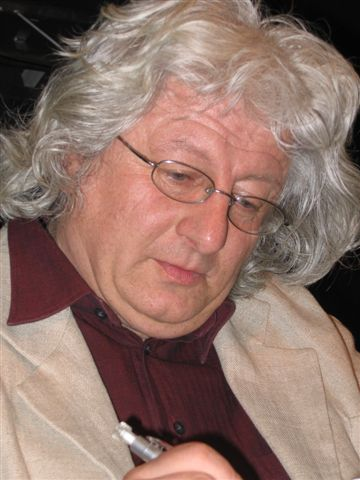
Péter Esterházy

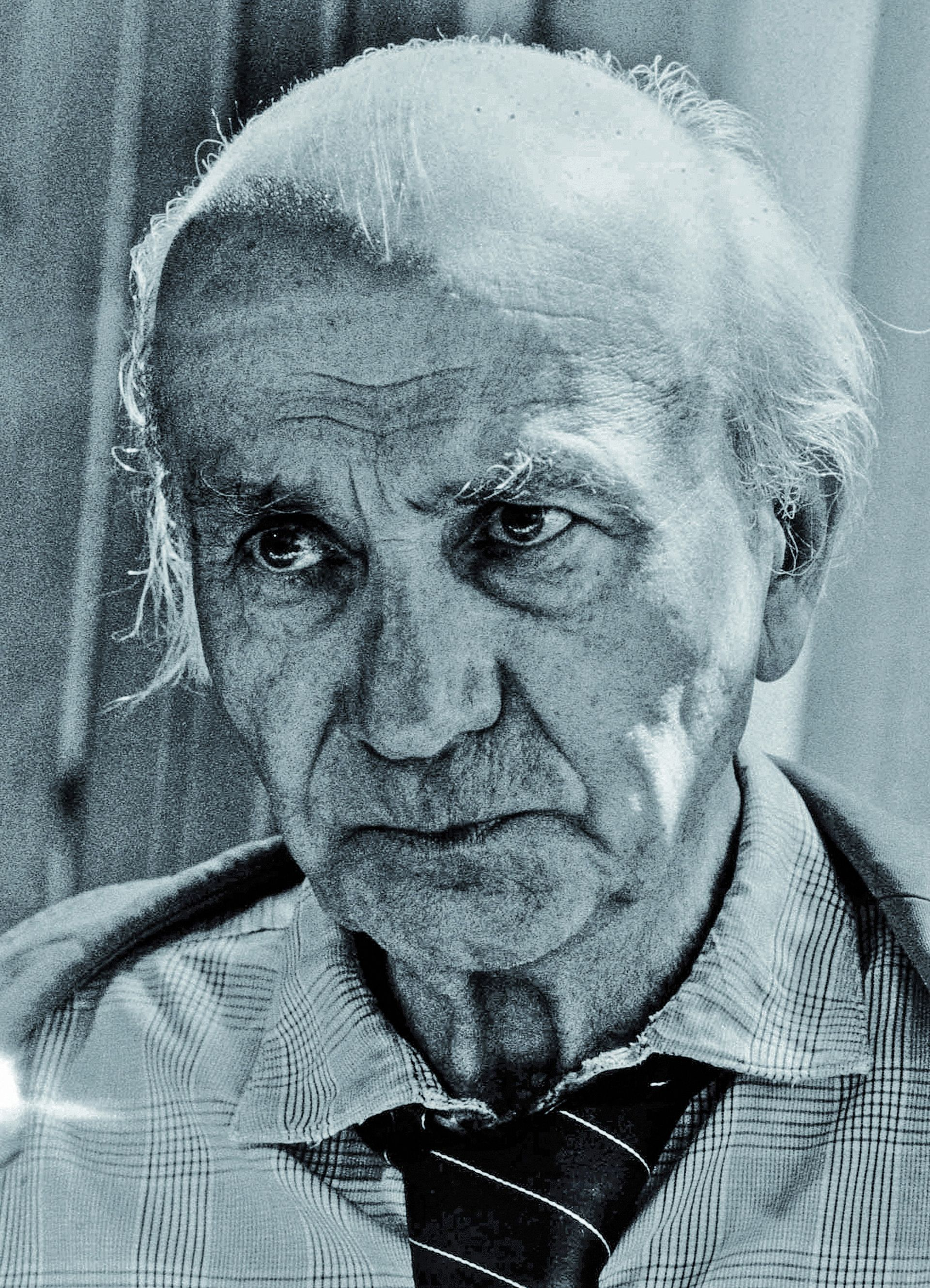
Gyula Illyés

== See also ==
- List of Hungarian writers
- List of libraries in Hungary
- List of the largest Hungarian-language books
- List of Hungarian writers and poets' comprehensive publication series
