= Sereda (surname) =

Sereda (Cyrillic: Середа) is a gender-neutral East Slavic surname which means Wednesday. Sierada is the Belarusian-language variant.

== People ==
=== Sereda ===
- Aleksandr Sereda (born 1983), Russian association football player
- Alexey Sereda (born 1966), Russian association football coach and a former player
- Anton Sereda (born 1980), Russian association football player
- David Sereda (born 1957), Canadian musician
- Liubov Sereda (born 1945), Soviet rhythmic gymnast
- Oleksiy Sereda (born 2005), Ukrainian diver
- Semyon Sereda (1871–1933), Soviet politician
- Valeriy Sereda (born 1959), retired high jumper
- Viacheslav Sereda (1951–2024), Soviet and Russian scholar in Hungarian studies

=== Other forms ===
- Jan Sierada (1879–c. 1943), Belarusian statesman

== See also ==
- Środa, Polish cognate
