= Harmonia Caelestis =

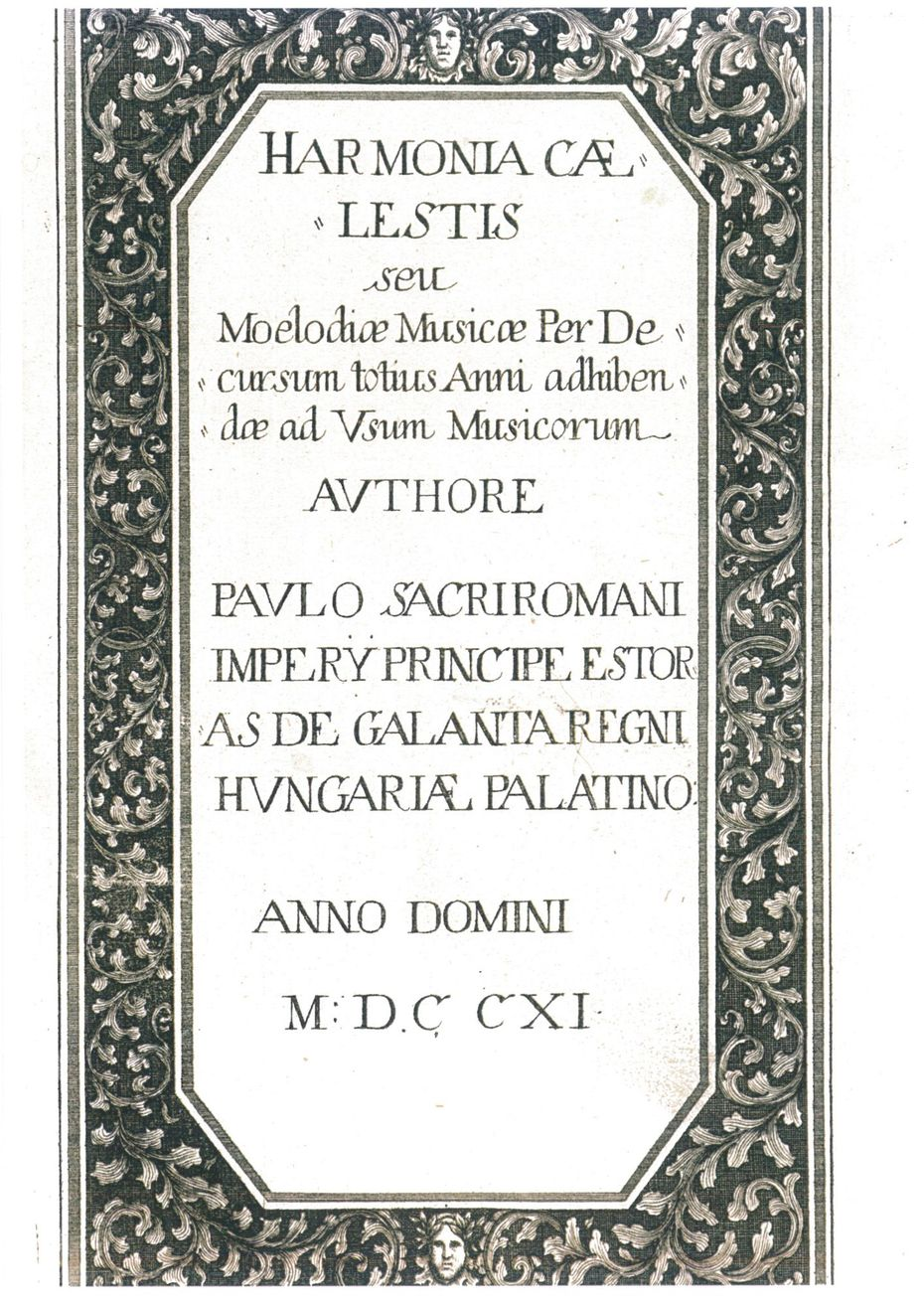
Title page

Harmonia Caelestis is a cycle of 55 sacred cantatas attributed to the Hungarian composer Paul I, 1st Prince Esterházy of Galántha (1635–1713) and published in 1711. They are in the Baroque style and incorporate traditional Hungarian and German melodies. Each of the cantatas consists of one movement. They are composed for solo voices (the majority for one solo voice, although there are some duets), choir, and orchestra (including violas, violone, harp, bassoon, theorba, violins, flutes, trumpets, organ, timpani).

Péter Esterházy's 2001 novel Harmonia Caelestis takes its name from the composition.

== Recordings ==
- Esterházy: Harmonia Caelestis – Mária Zádori, Márta Fers (sopranos), Katalin Gémes (mezzo-soprano), Katalin Károlyi (contralto), Gábor Kállay (tenor), József Moldvay (bass); Savaria Vocal Ensemble, Capella Savaria, conducted by Pál Németh. Label: Hungaroton HCD31148-49
- Christmas Baroque Music – contains Harmonia Caelestis No. 1 "Sol recedit igneus" and No. 7 "Cur fles, Jesu". Label: Capriccio C10558.
