= Rage Over a Lost Penny =

Piano piece by Ludwig van Beethoven

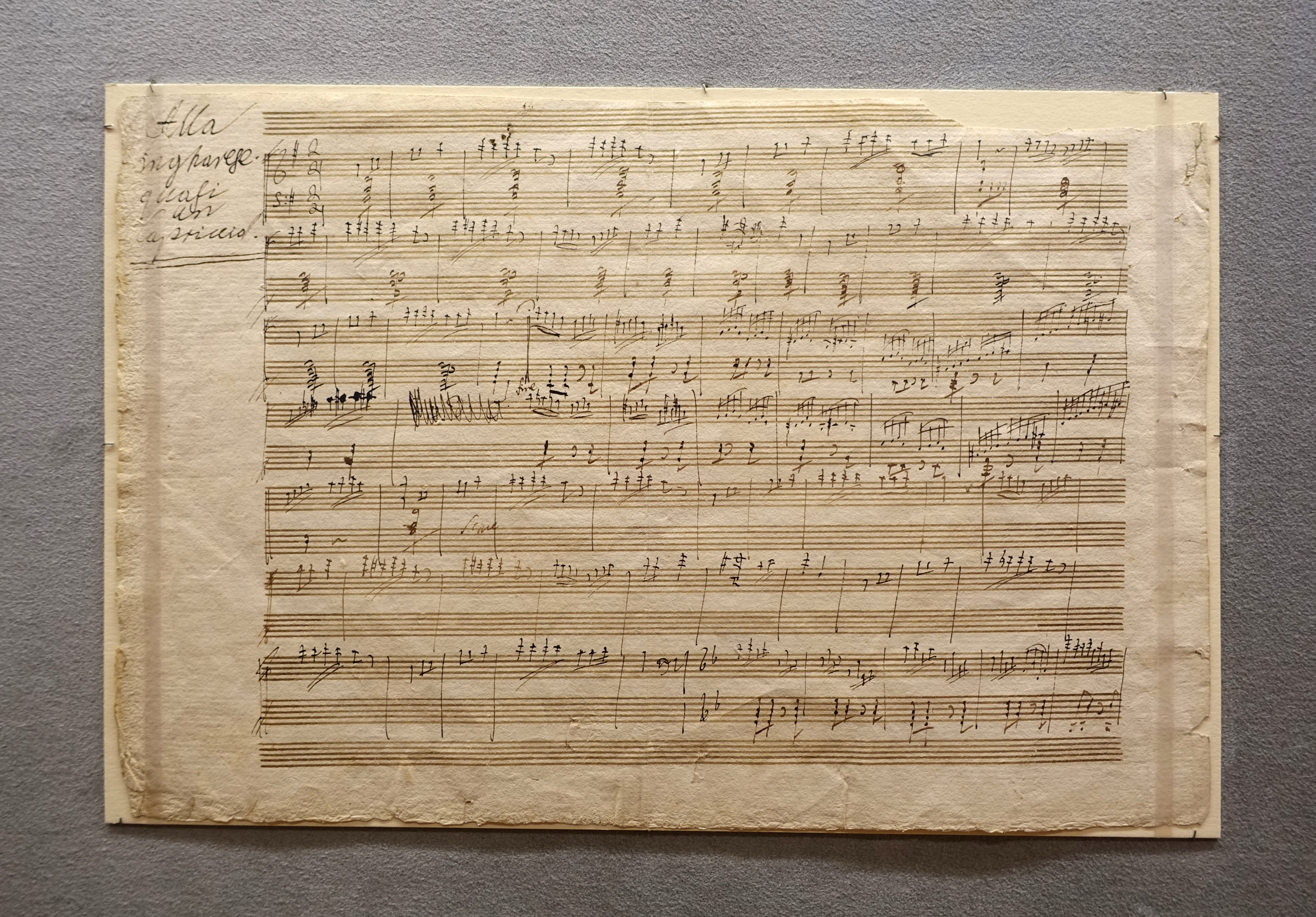
Alla ingharese quasi un Capriccio score, 1794–1795, musical autograph

The "Rondo alla ingharese quasi un capriccio" in G major, Op. 129 (Italian for "Rondo in the Hungarian [i.e. gypsy] style, almost a caprice"), is a rondo for piano written by Ludwig van Beethoven. It is better known by the title Rage Over a Lost Penny, Vented in a Caprice (from "German: Die Wut über den verlorenen Groschen, ausgetobt in einer Caprice)". This title appears on the autograph manuscript, but not in Beethoven's hand, and has been attributed to his friend Anton Schindler. It is a favourite with audiences and is frequently performed as a showpiece.

== Music ==
Despite the late opus number, the work's composition has been dated to between 1795 and 1798. Beethoven left the piece unpublished and incomplete; it was published in 1828 by Anton Diabelli, who obscured the fact that it had been left unfinished. The performance time runs between five and six minutes; the tempo of the piece is Allegro vivace (= 132–160).

The indication alla ingharese is of interest, as no such word as "ingharese" exists in standard Italian. To people of Beethoven's day, "Gypsy music" and "Hungarian music" were synonymous terms. Beethoven seems to have conflated alla zingarese (in the Gypsy style) and all'ongarese (in the Hungarian style) to come up with the term alla ingharese.

Robert Schumann wrote of the work that "it would be difficult to find anything merrier than this whim... It is the most amiable, harmless anger, similar to that felt when one cannot pull a shoe from off the foot," citing the work as an instance of Beethoven's earthliness against those who exult in a transcendental image of the composer.

Erwin Schulhoff arranged the work for orchestra.

== See also ==
- A capriccio
