= Viacheslav Sereda =

Viacheslav Sereda Вячеслав Середа
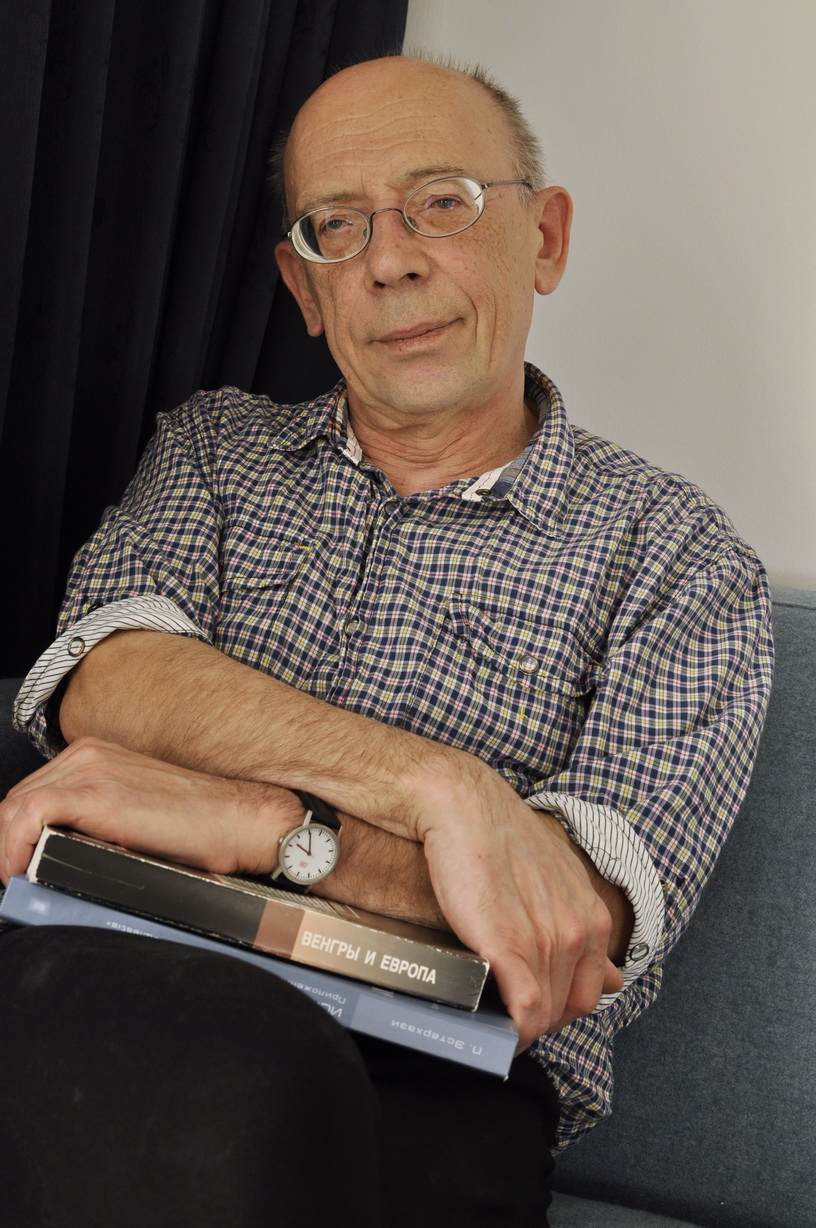
- Born: 26 March 1951; Nizhniy Tagil, Sverdlovsk Oblast, USSR
- Died: 25 July 2024 (aged 73); Amsterdam, Netherlands
- Education: Leningrad State University

Viacheslav Sereda (Russian: Вячеслав Середа, 26 March 1951, Nizhny Tagil - 25 July 2024, Amsterdam) was a prominent Soviet and Russian scholar in Hungarian studies, prolific translator from Hungarian into Russian, literary historian, and editor.

== Professional activities ==
Viacheslav Sereda graduated from the Finno-Ugric Department of the Philology Faculty of the Leningrad State University in 1974. From 1977 to 2013 he worked at the Institute for Slavic Studies of the Russian Academy of Sciences. As a scholar at the Institute he authored the Hungarian chapters in the monumental History of the Eastern European Literatures after WW II (in the second volume his co-author was Yury Gusev).

At the same time, Viacheslav Sereda started his collaboration with the prominent Soviet publishing houses Khudozhestvennaya Literatura and Raduga as an editor and literary translator. In the 1980s Sereda edited collections of Tibor Déry, Andor Endre Gelléri, Gyula Krúdy, Sándor Weöres, and other Hungarian authors.

With the start of a new political epoch in Russia in 1992 when state archives started opening, Viacheslav Sereda plunged into documents related to the 1956 Hungarian Revolution and published such important collections of documents as The Soviet Union and the Hungarian Crisis of 1956 in Russian and Hiányzó lapok 1956 történetéből (ISBN 963-11-7085-3 1993) and Döntés a Kremlben, 1956. Viták Magyarországról az SZKP KB elnökségi ülésein (ISBN 978-963-04-5980-8, 1996) in Hungarian.

== Literary translations ==
In 2000 Viacheslav Sereda returned to literary translation. He published Russian versions of the books by major contemporary Hungarian writers, including Péter Esterházy whose opus magnum, Harmonia Caelestis, and its dramatic sequel, Revised Edition, Sereda translated in 2008.

In 2014, Viacheslav Sereda published his Russian translation of the first big novel by another leading Hungarian writer Péter Nádas titled The Book of Memories. Works by László Krasznahorkai, the third of contemporary Hungarian literary giants, followed: Sereda's Russian Satantango was published in 2016 and The Melancholy of Resistance in 2019. Sereda's translation of Baron Wenckheim's Homecoming remained unfinished.

As an editor, Viacheslav Sereda produced in 2002 collection of essays Hungarians and Europe that showed how close Hungarians were to the Russians in their very problematic belonging to Europe. In 2005, he compiled and edited the largest collection of Attila József's poetry available in Russian. Till his last days Sereda thought of how to keep publishing Russian translations of the authors he worked with – thus, the Russian volume of Péter Nádas' essays on art The Lady in Gold was published in St. Petersburg in 2023. Besides, Viacheslav Sereda translated into Russian works by Lajos Parti Nagy, István Orosz, Péter Gárdos, Géza Szőcs, Ádám Nádasdy, György Spiró, and many others.

== Awards ==
In 1998 Viacheslav Sereda was awarded the Imre Nagy memorial plaque for his research on the Hungarian revolution of 1956. In 2005, he received the Pro Cultura Hungarica award for the promotion of Hungarian literature in Russia. In 2003 he won the Inolit prize awarded by the Russian world literature magazine Inostrannaya Literarutra and the Illyuminator prize for the best research-themed translation of the past year (2008).

Sereda was a member of the Masters of Literary Translation Guild, the Russian literary translation association, and was awarded the Master of Translation Award in 2015 for the translation of The Book of Memories by Péter Nádas. Besides, Viacheslav Sereda is the winner of the Hungarian Füst Milán Translation Award in 2023. Since 2023, he was an honorary member of the Hungarian Széchenyi Academy of Literature and Arts.

Sereda's translations have been repeatedly nominated for major literary awards in Russia. In 2020, two of his translations were nominated for the Piatigorsky Literary Award: Satan Tango by László Krasznahorkai and The Chess Party on the Island by István Orosz. In 2018, Péter Nádas' Book of Memories translated by Viacheslav Sereda was nominated for the Yasnaya Polyana Prize. In 2019, Sereda's translation of László Krasznahorkai's Satantango got the same nomination. In 2022 his translation of Péter Nádas' collection of shorter prose pieces A Walk Around the Wild Pear was short-listed for this award.
