= Zoltán of Transylvania =

Zoltán of Transylvania (Hungarian: Erdőelvi Zoltán, Latin: Erdeelui Zoltan) was the first voivode of Transylvania reigning from 1003 to 1011 according to a 14th-century chronicle. Modern historians do not accept the chronicle's claim.

== Identity ==
According to the Chronicon Pictum, he was the same person as Stephen's great-grandfather, Zolta. Modern historians debate this because he would be over 100 years by that time and instead suggest that Mark of Kalt confused them. It is likely that Zoltán was a relative of the king, maybe his brother.
