= A capriccio =

A capriccio [a kkaˈprittʃo] (Italian: "following one's fancy") is a tempo marking indicating a free and capricious approach to the tempo (and possibly the style) of the piece. This marking will usually modify another, such as lento a capriccio, often used in the Hungarian Rhapsodies of Franz Liszt. Perhaps the most famous piece to use the term is Ludwig van Beethoven's ""Rondo alla ingharese quasi un capriccio", Op. 129, better known as "Rage Over a Lost Penny".

== See also ==
- Capriccio (music)
