= List of the largest Hungarian-language books =

The following list lists the largest Hungarian-language books, taking into account the following criteria:

- the given work reaches 1000 printed pages (regardless of the volume number, the physical size of the pages), but there may be minor differences in the number of pages in different databases;
- original and translated works published in Hungarian in Hungary;
- works published in print, in book circulation (i.e. excluding manuscript works).

The list includes several million books published from the medieval beginnings of Hungarian literature to the present day, and due to possible problems with the availability of their data, it cannot be considered complete. The list does not include book series, which can be found on the page entitled List of Hungarian book series.

== 17.000+ page ==
Extent (pages)	Author	Title	Volume number	Publisher	Place of publication	Publication time	Source	Notes
17880	Johann Baptist Weiss	World History	22 volumes	Self-published	Temesvár	1896–1905		The most extensive Hungarian-language world history ever published, and probably the most extensive Hungarian-language book.
17486	Mór János Révai, Elemér Varjú (editors)	Révai Great Encyclopedia	19+2 volumes	Révai Testvérek	Budapest	1911–1935		Probably the most extensive book written by Hungarian authors.
17475	multiple authors	Hungarian Grand Encyclopedia	19 volumes	Akadémiai Kiadó	Budapest	2004		
17324	István Kollega Tarsoly (editor)	Révai New Encyclopedia	19 volumes	Babits Kiadó	Szekszárd	2008		

== 16.000+ page ==
Extent (pages)	Author	Title	Volume number	Publisher	Place of publication	Publication time	Source, note
16744	multiple authors	Pallas Great Encyclopedia	16+2 volumes	Pallas Irodalmi és Nyomdai Rt.	Budapest	1893–1900	
16685	István Diós, János Viczián (editors)	Hungarian Catholic Encyclopedia	17 volumes	Szent István Társulat	Budapest	1993–2014	

== 15.000+ page ==
Extent (pages)	Author	Title	Volume number	Publisher	Place of publication	Publication time	Source, note
31,124 columns, 15771 pages	Pál Gulyás	Lives and Works of Hungarian Writers – New Series	31 volumes	Hungarian Association of Librarians and Archivists, later from the 1990s Argumentum Kiadó	Budapest	1939–2025	Columns numbered; half corresponds to page count. About 1/3 still in manuscript. Likely the largest single Hungarian-language book by a single Hungarian author.
15742	István Király, István Szerdahelyi (chief editors)	World Literature Encyclopedia	19 volumes	Akadémiai Kiadó	Budapest	1970–1996	
15318	multiple authors	Britannica Hungarica World Encyclopedia	20 volumes	Lexikon Kiadó	Budapest	2009	

== 12.000+ page ==
Extent (pages)	Author	Title	Volume number	Publisher	Place of publication	Publication time	Source, note
12943	Caesar Cantu	World History	15 + 2 volumes	Szent István Társulat	Eger	1856–1876	
12570	multiple authors	The Austro-Hungarian Monarchy in Text and Image	21 volumes	Hungarian Royal State Printing House	Budapest	1887–1901	

== 11.000+ page ==
Extent (pages)	Author	Title	Volume number	Publisher	Place of publication	Publication time	Source, note
11701	editor Samu Borovszky	Counties and Cities of Hungary	25 volumes	Országos Monografia Társaság	Budapest	1896–1914	Data for 5 volumes unknown.
11381	editors Erzsébet Andics – Lajos Elekes – Zsigmond Pál Pach – György Székely	History of Hungary	8 volumes	Akadémiai Kiadó	Budapest	1976–1985	
11122	editor Pongrác Sörös	History of the Pannonhalma Order of Saint Benedict	12 volumes	Stephaneum	Budapest	1902–1912	

== 9000+ page ==
Extent (pages)	Author	Title	Volume number	Publisher	Place of publication	Publication time	Source, note
9494	editor Ede Somogyi	Hungarian Lexicon	16 volumes	Rautmann Frigyes, Wilckens és Waidl, Gerő Lajos, then Pallas Irodalmi és Nyomdai Rt.	Budapest	1879–1885	

== 8000+ page ==
Extent (pages)	Author	Title	Volume number	Publisher	Place of publication	Publication time	Source, note
8231	multiple authors	Knowledge base	10 volumes	Heckenast Gusztáv	Pest	1858–1864	
8013	multiple authors	Teachers' Portrait Gallery	24 volumes (until 2025)	Karácsony Sándor Pedagógiai Egyesület	Debrecen	2002–present	

== 7000+ page ==
Extent (pages)	Author	Title	Volume number	Publisher	Place of publication	Publication time	Source, note
7955	ed. J. P. Francev	World History	10 volumes	Kossuth Könyvkiadó	Budapest	1962–1966	
7802	ed. Henrik Marczali	Large Illustrated World History	12 volumes	Franklin-Társulat Magyar Irod. Intézet & Révai Testvérek Irodalmi Intézet	Budapest	1898–1905	
7756	ed. László Markó	New Hungarian Biographical Lexicon	6 volumes	Helikon Kiadó	Budapest	2001–2007	
7722	multiple authors	Public Knowledge Repository	12 volumes	Wigand Ottó	Pest	1831–1834	
7560	ed. Dr. Bernát Kocsis & László Bedő	The History of World War II 1939–1945	12 volumes	Zrínyi Military Publishing	Budapest	1976–1984	
7436	multiple authors	Bibliography of Hungarian Literary History	10 volumes	Akadémiai Kiadó–Argumentum Kiadó	Budapest	1972–2013	
7280	Alfred Brehm	The Animal World	10 volumes	Légrády Testvérek	Budapest	1901–1907	
7243		Hungarian Ethnography (“Eight-volume Hungarian Ethnography”)	8 volumes	Akadémiai Kiadó Zrt.	Budapest	1988–2011	
7232	ed. Sándor Matlekovits	Economic and Cultural State of Hungary at the Millennium and the Results of the 1896 Millennium Exhibition	9 volumes	Pesti Könyvnyomda Rt.	Budapest	1897–1898	
7108	Jenő Pintér	History of Hungarian Literature: Scientific Classification	8 volumes	n. a.	Budapest	1930–1941	

== 6000+ page ==
Extent (pages)	Author	Title	Volume number	Publisher	Place of publication	Publication time	Source, note
6891	Béla Máriássy	History of Hungarian Legislation and Hungary	18 volumes	self-published	Budapest–Győr	1884–1893	
6888	Antal Pezenhoffer	History of the Hungarian Nation (from the Battle of Mohács to Present Day): The Historical Role of the Catholic Church and the House of Habsburg; Historical Apologetics	13 volumes	Peace and Justice Pilisszentlélek Model Foundation, Út-Igazság-Élet Publisher	Pilisszentlélek	1993–2006	
6818	Iván Nagy	Families of Hungary with Coats of Arms and Genealogical Tables	12 volumes	Published by Mór Ráth	Pest	1857–1868	
6744	ed. Antal Süle	Illustrated Chronicle of the World War	9 volumes	Révai Publishing	Budapest	1916	
6711	ed. Ferenc Ribáry, Antal Molnár, Henrik Marczali	World History	8+1 volumes	Published by Vilmos Mehner	Budapest	1879–1892	
6611	ed. Sándor Szilágyi	History of the Hungarian Nation	10 volumes	Athenaeum Literary and Printing Company	Budapest	1894–1898	
6508	ed. Árpád Bókay, Károly Kétli, Frigyes Korányi	Handbook of Internal Medicine	6 volumes	Hungarian Medical Publishing Association, Eggenberger Bookstore (Rényi Károly)	Budapest	1894–1899	Published in the series Library of the Hungarian Medical Publishing Association.
6492	multiple authors	The World War 1914–1918, with Special Regard to Hungary and the Role of Hungarian Troops	10 volumes	Hungarian Royal Military Archives	Budapest	1928–1942	
6400	ed. Nándor Koch	Tolnai’s World History new edition	20 volumes	Hungarian Commercial Gazette and Book Publishing Co.	Budapest	1926–1931	A completely revised, 20-volume new edition of the 10-volume edition of 1908–1912.
6359	multiple authors	Tolnai's New World Encyclopedia	18+2 volumes	Tolnai Printing Institute and Publishing Company	Budapest	1926–1933	
6256	multiple authors	Encyclopedia of New Times	24 volumes	Singer & Wolfner Literary Institute	Budapest	1936–1942	
6115	chief editor: Tibor Erdey-Grúz	Scientific Encyclopedia	7 volumes	Akadémiai Kiadó	Budapest	1964–1976	

== 5000+ page ==
Extent (pages)	Author	Title	Volume number	Publisher	Place of publication	Publication time	Source, note
5867	Gusztáv Wenzel	New Charters of the Árpád Era	12 volumes	Hungarian Academy of Sciences	Pest?	1860–1874	
5656	ed. Dezső Márkus	Hungarian Legal Encyclopedia	6 volumes	Pallas Literary and Printing Company	Budapest	1898–1907	
5607	F. J. Holzwarth	World History	9 volumes	Published by Ferenc Szabó	Temesvár	1887–1892	
5563	Archduke József of Habsburg–Lorraine	The World War as I Saw It	7 volumes	Hungarian Academy of Sciences	Budapest	1934	
5444	Béla Kempelen	Hungarian Noble Families	11 volumes	Károly Grill Publishing Company	Budapest	1911–1932	
5279	multiple authors	Tolnai World Encyclopedia	8 volumes	Tolnai Printing Institute and Publishing Company	Budapest	1912–1919	Incomplete.
5238	József Szinnyei	Lives and Works of Hungarian Writers	14 volumes	Viktor Hornyánszky Academic Bookstore	Budapest	1891–1914	The work has column numbering; page numbers are halved accordingly.
5136	multiple authors	Hungarian Bibliography 1921–1944	7+1 volumes	National Széchényi Library	Budapest	1980–1992	Volume 3 has a supplementary “3/A” volume.
5019	multiple authors	Universal Hungarian Encyclopaedia	12 volumes	Saint Stephen Society	Budapest	1859–1876	Uses column numbering.

== 4000+ page ==
Extent (pages)	Author	Title	Volume number	Publisher	Place of publication	Publication time	Source, note
4767	ed. István Sőtér	History of Hungarian Literature	6 volumes	Akadémiai Kiadó	Budapest	1964–1966	
4741	multiple authors	New Hungarian Encyclopedia	6+2 volumes	Akadémiai Kiadó	Budapest	1960–1981	
4706	József Teleki	The Hunyadi Era in Hungary	6 volumes	Published by Gusztáv Emich	Pest	1852–1863	Continuation of Dezső Csánki's Historical Geography of Hungary in the Hunyadi Era.
4676	Mihály Horváth	History of the Hungarians	8 volumes	Gusztáv Heckenast	Pest	1871–1873	3rd edition
4591	eds. László Gerő, János Bud, Jenő Czettler, Baron József Szterényi, Baron Frigyes Korányi, Ferenc Fodor, Pál Teleki	Encyclopaedia of Economics	4 volumes	Athenaeum Literary and Printing Co.	Budapest	1929	
4483	multiple authors	Bibliography of the History of Budapest	7 volumes	Szabó Ervin Metropolitan Library	Budapest	1974	
4418	multiple authors	Medical Encyclopedia	4 volumes	Akadémiai Kiadó	Budapest	1967–1973	
4413	Károly Szladits	Hungarian Civil Law	6 volumes	Grill Károly Publishing	Budapest	1939–1942	
4409	József Dóczy	Europe in its Current Natural, Industrial and Governmental State	12 volumes	Antal Haykul	Vienna	1829–1831	
4277	Professor Dr. Ref. T. Hans Petzsch	Urania: Animal and Plant World	8 volumes	Gondolat Publishing	Budapest	1982	
4261	multiple authors	Old Hungarian Printed Works	4 volumes	Akadémiai Kiadó – Bibliotheca Nationalis Hungariae	Budapest	1971–(2012)	Work not yet completed (2021).
4245	eds. Lajos Mangold, Cyril Horváth	Tolnai’s World History	10 volumes	Hungarian Commercial Gazette and Book Publishing Co.	Budapest	1908–1912	
4147	multiple authors	Monograph of Hungarian Stamps	6 volumes	Transportation Documentation Company	Budapest	1965–1973	
4130	multiple authors	The World of Nature	10 volumes	Royal Hungarian Society of Natural Sciences	Budapest	1938–1942	
4047	multiple authors	Encyclopedia of the Practicing Physician	4 volumes	Medicina Publishing	Budapest	1977	
4031	ed. Ágnes Kenyeres	Hungarian Biographical Encyclopedia	2+2 volumes	Akadémiai Kiadó	Budapest	1967–1994	
4020	multiple authors	Encyclopaedia of Modern Knowledge	6 volumes	Gusztáv Heckenast	Pest	1850–1855	

== 3000+ page ==
Extent (pages)	Author	Title	Volume number	Publisher	Place of publication	Publication time	Source, note
3984	multiple authors	History of Philosophy	7 volumes	Gondolat Publishing	Budapest	1970	
3968	multiple authors	New Encyclopedia	6 volumes	Dante Publishing – Pantheon Literary Institute	Budapest	1936	
3825	ed. Zalán Endrei	History of the World	6 volumes	«Globus» Institute and Publishing Company	Budapest	1906–1912	
3730	Dezső Csánki – Antal Fekete Nagy	Hungary in the Era of the Hunyadis	5 volumes	?	Budapest	1890–1941	This work belongs to the Teleki József edition of The Era of the Hunyadis.
3721	Heinrich Graetz	The History of the Jews	6 volumes	Phönix Literary Joint-Stock Company	Budapest	1906–1908	
3620	Jenő Cholnoky	The Earth and Its Life	6 volumes	Franklin Literary and Printing Co.	Budapest	1930	
3570	multiple authors	Hungarian Ethnographic Encyclopedia	5 volumes	Akadémiai Publishing	Budapest	1982	
3422	János Szendrei	History and General Gazetteer of the City of Miskolc	5 volumes	Published by the Community of Miskolc	Miskolc	1886–1911	
3359	Sámuel Mindszenthy	Ladvocat Apáturnak … Historical Dictionary	6 volumes	Bálint Weinmüller	Komárom	1795–1797	
3338	ed. István Kiszely	Peoples of the Earth	5 volumes	Gondolat Publishing	Budapest	1979–2005	
3312	ed. Sándor Domanovszky	History of Hungarian Culture	5 volumes	Hungarian Historical Society	Budapest	1939–1942	
3305	(ed.) Bálint Hóman – Gyula Szekfű	Hungarian History	8 volumes	Royal Hungarian University Press	Budapest	1928	In the 1930s a new edition appeared in 5 volumes.
3289	Károly Szabó – Árpád Hellebrant	Old Hungarian Library	4 volumes	Hungarian Academy of Sciences	Budapest	1879–1898	
3284	multiple authors	Gutenberg Grand Encyclopedia	10 volumes	Grand Encyclopedia Publishing Office	Budapest	1931–1932	Incomplete series.
3266	multiple authors	Hungary in the 20th Century	5 volumes	Babits Publishing	Budapest	1996	
3252	multiple authors	Hungarian Larousse Encyclopedia	3 volumes	Librairie Larousse–Akadémiai Publishing	Budapest	1991–1994	
3236	multiple authors	Hungarian Bibliography 1945–1960	5 volumes	National Széchényi Library	Budapest	1965–1968	
3174	chief ed. Károly Polinszky	Technical Encyclopedia	4 volumes	Akadémiai Publishing	Budapest	1970–1978	
3158	Géza Petrik	Hungary Bibliography 1712–1860	4 volumes	Ágost Dobrovszky	Budapest	1888–1897	Later 5 additional volumes were prepared as supplements.
3083	(ed.) Gusztáv Heinrich	Universal Literary History	4 volumes	Franklin Society	Budapest	1903–1911	
3065	multiple authors	Art Encyclopedia	4 volumes	Akadémiai Publishing	Budapest	1965–1968	
3031	Aladár György	The Earth and Its Peoples	5 volumes	Franklin Literary Institute and Printing House	Budapest	1904–1906	
3024	ed. László Bagossy	Encyclopaedia Hungarica	4 volumes	Hungarian Ethnic Lexicon Foundation	Calgary	1998	
3001	Ernő Curtius	History of the Greeks	6 volumes	Publishing House of the Hungarian Academy of Sciences	Budapest	1875–1880	

== 2000+ page ==
Extent (pages)	Author	Title	Volume number	Publisher	Place of publication	Publication time	Source, note
2992	László Szalay	History of Hungary 2nd edition	6 volumes	Vilmos Lauffer	Pest	1860–1866	
2952	multiple authors	The Franklin Hand Lexicon	3 volumes	Franklin Irodalmi és Nyomdai Rt.	Budapest	1911–1912	
2957	editor László Gerevich	History of Budapest	5 volumes	Akadémiai Kiadó	Budapest	1970–1980	
2905	Ernő Renan	History of Christianity	7 volumes	Dick Manó Kiadása	Budapest	1928	
2890	Konrád Szántó	History of the Catholic Church	3 volumes	Ecclesia Könyvkiadó	Budapest	1987	
2880	János Katschthaler	Katschthaler's Systematic Catholic Theology	6 volumes	Szent István Társulat	Budapest	1896–1899	
2874	László Korizmics, D. Benkő, István Morócz	The Book of Field Agriculture	6 volumes	J. Herz (Economic Society)	Pest	1855–1868	
2866	editor Béla Schack	The Hungarian Merchant's Book	4 volumes	Révai Testvérek Irodalmi Intézet Rt.	Budapest	1907–1911	
2847	multiple authors	History of Hungarian Railways	7 volumes	Közlekedési Dokumentációs Kft.	Budapest	1999	
2835	György Györffy	Historical Geography of Hungary in the Árpád Era	4 volumes	Akadémiai Kiadó	Budapest	1987–1998	
2802	multiple authors	Hungarian Codex	6 volumes	Kossuth Kiadó	Budapest	1991–2001	
2800	multiple authors	Lexicon of Works	3 volumes	Magyar Nagylexikon Kiadó Zrt.	Budapest	2008	
2781	Sámuel Szeremlei	History of Hódmezővásárhely	5 volumes	"Published by the city's public"	Budapest	1900–1912	
2766	editor Gyula Szekfű	Universal History	4 volumes	Published by Magyar Szemle	Budapest	1937	
2718	Tivadar Mommsen	History of the Romans	8 volumes	Franklin Társulat	Budapest	1874–1877	
2638	Albert Bedő	Economic and Commercial Description of the Forests of the Hungarian State	4 volumes	Ministry of Agriculture	Budapest	1896	
2622	editors Béla Bangha – Antal Ijjas	History of the Christian Church	8 volumes	Pázmány Péter Literary Society	Budapest	1937–1941	
2580	Miksa Duncker	History of Antiquity	4 volumes	Franklin Társulat	Budapest	1876–1878	
2577	János Reizner	History of Szeged	5 volumes	Published by the citizens of the Royal City of Szeged	Szeged	1893–1901	
2569	Jenő Sobó	Forestry Engineering (Civil Engineering, Road, Railway, and Bridge Engineering)	3 volumes	Widow and Son of Ágost Joerges Printing House	Selmecbánya	1898–1900	
2543	editors Sándor Halász and Gyula Mandello	Economic Lexicon	3 volumes	Pallas Literary and Printing Company	Budapest	1898–1901	
2512	editor Tivadar Lándor	The Great War in Writing and Images	7 volumes	Athenaeum Literary and Printing Rt.	Budapest	1915–1926	
2482	Ferenc Hettinger	Defense of Christianity	5 volumes	Érsek-Lyceum Printing House	Eger	1883–1884	
2440	editor Károly Kelety	Official Report on the 1885 National General Exhibition in Budapest	4 volumes	Károly Grill	Budapest	1886	
2439	Elek Benedek	Hungarian Folk Tales and Legends	5 volumes	Athenaeum	Budapest	1894–1896	
2402	editor Vilmos Pecz	Ancient Lexicon	2 volumes	Franklin Literary and Printing Rt.	Budapest	1902–1904	
2354	multiple authors	Bibliography of Hungarian Agricultural Literature	5 volumes	Agricultural Book and Journal Publishing Company	Budapest	1934–1961	
2351	János József Gudenus	Genealogy of the Hungarian Nobility in the 20th Century	5 volumes	Hungarian Agricultural Publishing Ltd.	Budapest	1990–1999	
2349	Imre Palugyay	Historical, Topographical, and Latest Official Description of Hungary	4 volumes	Gusztáv Heckenast Publishing	Pest	1852–1855	
2332	multiple authors	New Hungarian Literary Lexicon	3 volumes	Akadémiai Kiadó	Budapest	1994	
2330	István Gyárfás	History of the Jászkun People	4 volumes	K. Szilády	Kecskemét	1870–1885	
2325	Ferenc Toldy	Handbook of Hungarian Poetry from the Battle of Mohács to the Present, or the Most Distinguished Poets of the Last Quarter Century in Biographies and Character Sketches	5 volumes	Franklin Társulat	Budapest	1876	
2322	Multiple authors	History of Hungary: Its Land, People, Life, Economy, Literature, and Arts from Verecke to the Present	5 volumes	Franklin Irodalmi és Nyomdai Rt.	Budapest	1929	
2316	Lázár, Gyula	History of England	4 volumes	Szabó Ferencz	Temesvár	1892–1893	
2310	Tóth, Béla; Beznák, Aladár	The Hungarian Anecdote Treasury	6 volumes	Singer és Wolfner	Budapest	1899–1903	
2297	Gracza, György	The History of the 1848–49 Hungarian Revolution	5 volumes	Lampel R. Könyvkereskedése (Wodianer F. és fiai) Részvénytársaság	Budapest	1894–1898	
2245	Hunfalvy, János	Universal Geography	3 volumes	Athenaeum	Budapest	1884–1890	
2324	Multiple authors	Catholic Lexicon	4 volumes	Magyar Kultúra	Budapest	1931–1933	
2245	Multiple authors	The Face of the Modern World	4 volumes	Királyi Magyar Egyetemi Nyomda	Budapest	1938	
2175	Bartha, Dénes (editor-in-chief)	Musical Lexicon	2 volumes	Zeneműkiadó Vállalat	Budapest	1965	
2175	Warga, Lajos	History of the Christian Church	3 volumes	A magyar ref. egyház kiadása	Sárospatak	1880–1887	3rd edition, supplemented by Zoványi Jenő.
2170	Nagy, Antal	Religious Instruction in Examples	3 volumes	Szüts és társa	Ószőny	1876–1886	Volume 1 includes the 2nd edition of volume 2.
2163	Zalka, János; Zsihovics, Ferenc; Debreczeni, János	Lives of Saints	5 volumes	Érseki lyceum	Eger	1859–1876	
2124	Márki, Sándor; Marczali, Henrik	Universal and Domestic History	6 volumes	Athenaeum Irodalmi és Nyomdai Részvénytársulat	Budapest	1912	Also published in the "A Műveltség Könyvtára" series.
2104	Weber, György (Georg Weber)	Textbook of World History	5 volumes	Heckenast Gusztáv kiadása	Pest	1865–1869	
2098	Sándor, Pál	History of Philosophy	3 volumes	Akadémiai Kiadó	Budapest	1965	
2085	Kerékgyártó, Árpád Alajos	Handbook of the History of Hungary	7 volumes	Heckenast Gusztáv kiadása	Pest	1867–1874	
2069	Leroy-Beaulieu, P.	Finance	4 volumes	Magyar Tudományos Akadémia	Budapest	1879–1880	
2058	Bodon, József; Szalay, József	History of the Hungarian Nation	4 volumes	Lampel Róbert	Budapest	1895–1898	Revised 2nd edition by Baróti Lajos.
2054	Lázár, Gyula	History of the Russian Empire	4 volumes	Ráth Mór	Temesvár, Budapest	1890–1891	
2054	Márki, Sándor	II. Rákóczi Ferenc	3 volumes	Magyar Történelmi Társulat	Budapest	1907–1910	Part of the "Magyar Történeti Életrajzok" series.
2023	Riemann, Hugo; Brockhaus, Heinz Alfred	Musical Lexicon	2 volumes	Zeneműkiadó Vállalat	Budapest	1985	
2012	Multiple authors	Pedagogical Lexicon	4 volumes	Akadémiai Kiadó	Budapest	1977–1979	

== 1000+ page ==
Extent (pages)	Author	Title	Volume number	Publisher	Place of publication	Publication time	Source, note

== Other works ==
In addition to the above, there are other works, presumably over 1000 pages long, for which data is not always available.

Author	Title	Volume number	Publisher	Place of publication	Date of publication	Note
(ed.:) András Wilheim, András Székely	A systematic and phytogeographical handbook of Hungarian flora and vegetation	7 volumes	Akadémiai Kiadó	Budapest	1964–1985	
(editor-in-chief:) Péter Kőszeghy	Hungarian Encyclopedia of Cultural History	13 volumes	MAMÜL	Budapest	2003–2012	
Pál Angyal	The Handbook of Hungarian Criminal Law	21 volumes		Budapest	1927–1944	
József Bánlaky	The Military History of the Hungarian Nation	24 volumes	Grill Károly Publishing Company	Budapest	1928–1942	
editor Lajos Lóczy	Results of the Scientific Study of Lake Balaton	13 volumes	Hungarian Geographical Society Balaton Commission	Budapest	1911–1920	
Áldásy Antal	Coat of Arms of the Library of the Hungarian National Museum	8 volumes		Budapest	1904–1942	
Gyula Forster	The movable monuments	8 volumes		Budapest	1893	
Imre Nagy, Iván Nagy, Dezső Véghely	The documents of the older branch of the Zichy family of Counts Zichy of Zich and Vásonkeő	12 volumes		Pest, then Budapest	1871–1931	
István Szűcs	History of the free royal city of Debrecen	3 volumes		Debrecen	1871	
