= Aleksandr Sereda =

Russian footballer

Personal information
- Full name: Aleksandr Valeryevich Sereda
- Date of birth: 5 September 1983 (age 43)
- Height: 1.82 m (5 ft 11 1/2 in)
- Position: Defender

Youth career
- FC Chornomorets Odesa

Senior career*
Years	Team	Apps	(Gls)
2001	FC Ivan Odesa (amateur)		
2003	FC Ivan Odesa (amateur)		
2003–2004	FC Palmira Odesa	24	(0)
2005–2006	FC Metalurh-2 Zaporizhzhia	26	(1)
2006–2007	FC Metalurh Zaporizhzhia	0	(0)
2007	FC Ivan Odesa (amateur)		
2009–2010	FC Sakhalin Yuzhno-Sakhalinsk	50	(2)
2012–2016	FC Khadzhibey Usatove		
- * Club domestic league appearances and goals

Aleksandr Valeryevich Sereda or Oleksandr Valeriyovych Sereda (Russian: Александр Валерьевич Середа; Ukrainian: Олександр Валерійович Середа; born 5 September 1983) is a former Russian and Ukrainian professional football player.

== Club career ==
Sereda played in the Ukrainian Second League with FC Palmira Odesa and FC Metalurh-2 Zaporizhzhia.
