= Codex of Munich =

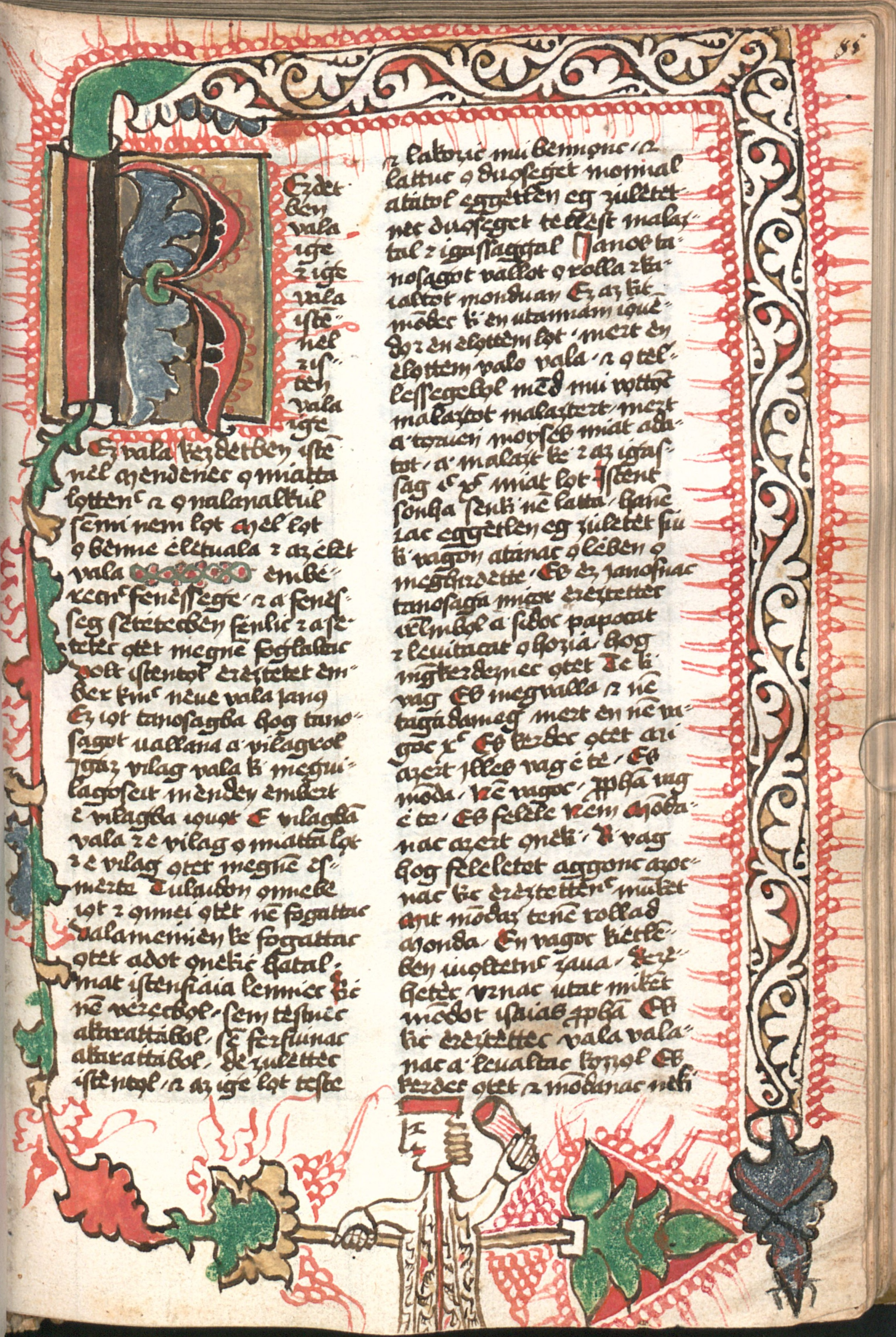
The first page of the New Testament

Codex of Munich (or Munich Codex) is a part of the oldest known Hungarian translation of the Bible, called Bible of Hussites (or the Hussite Bible). It was written at Tatros (today Târgu Trotuș, Romania) in 1466. Today it is located in Munich at Bavarian State Library. (Cod. Hung. 1)

== Content ==
The Codex of Munich contains the Hungarian translation of the four Gospels. At the recto of the 108th letter, at the end of Gospel of John, there is written who made the copy, where and when it was produced. As it is written, script was finished by György Németi, Son of Imre Henzsel. There is no further mention about him.

== Sources ==
- MÜNCHENI-KÓDEX | Magyar Nyelvemlékek
- Müncheni-kódex – Magyar Katolikus Lexikon
- Müncheni-kódex - Lexikon :: - Kislexikon
