= Gábor Mátray =

Hungarian librarian and composer (1797–1875)

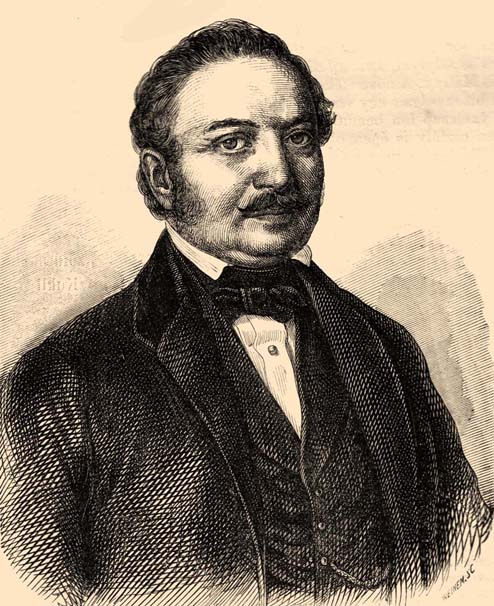

Background information
- Born: 23 November 1797; Nagykata
- Died: 17 July 1875 (aged 77) Budapest
- Occupation: Composer

Gábor Mátray (23 November 1797, in Nagykata – 17 July 1875, in Budapest) was a Hungarian librarian and composer.

Mátray was a librarian at the Hungarian National Museum in Budapest from 1847 to 1874. He distinguished himself as a collector and recorder of Hungarian folk songs, and as the founder of the Music Conservatory in Budapest (1840).
