= Mark of Kalt =

Hungarian canon and chronicler

- Kálti Márk
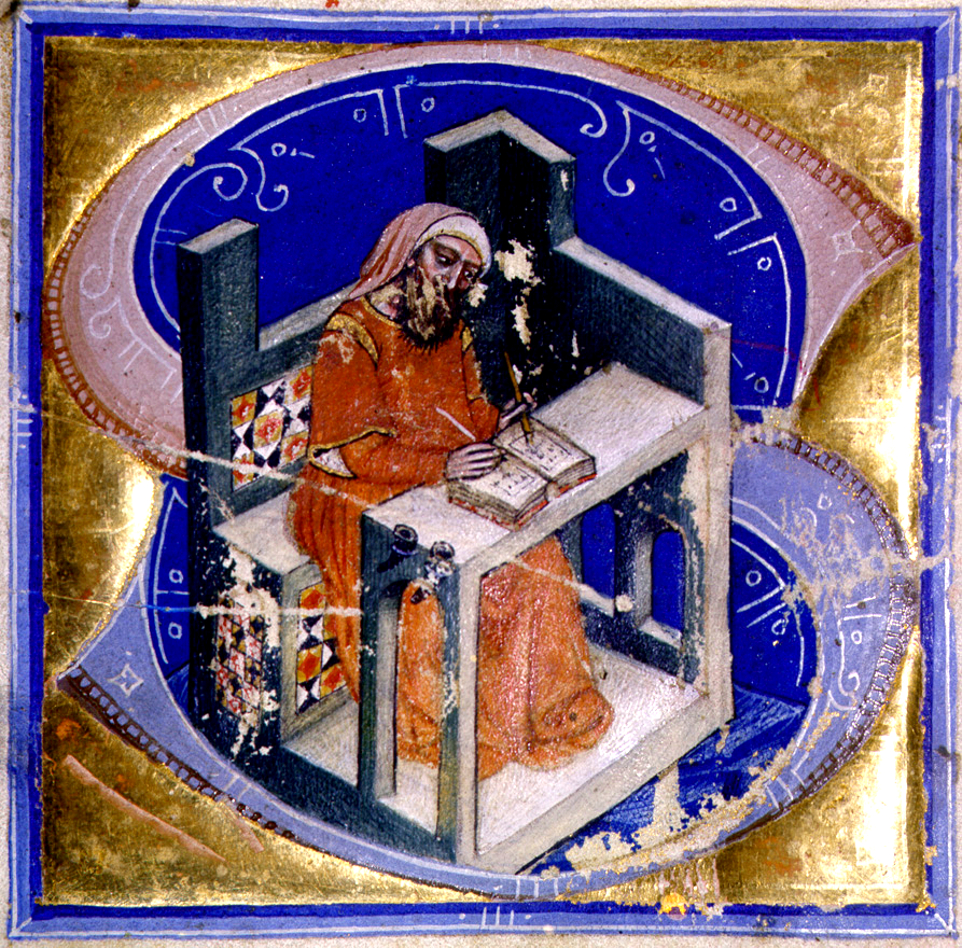
- Illumination of himself in the Chronicon Pictum
- Born: 14th century Veszprém County
- Died: 14th century
- Occupations: Priest, canon, chronicler, historian
- Writing career
- Language: Latin
- Subject: History of the Hungarians
- Notable work: Chronicon Pictum

Mark of Kalt (Hungarian: Kálti Márk, Latin: Marci de Kalt; fl. 1336–1368) was the canon of the Basilica of the Assumption of the Blessed Virgin Mary and chronicler of King Louis I of Hungary, known for his work Chronicon Pictum, written in 1358 in Latin, with the last of the illuminations being finished between 1370 and 1373. He likely died while working, because contemporary sources stopped mentioning him.

== Career ==
The Illuminated Chronicle was written by Mark of Kalt from the court of King Louis the Great of Hungary from 1358

He was born a member of the lower nobility in Veszprém County. His father was a certain Michael. He had a brother Briccius. According to a 1361 charter, Mark's nephew was clergyman Dominic, who served as the guardian of Győr from 1361 to 1382.

He became a Franciscan friar. From 1336 to 1337 he was court priest and chaplain of Elizabeth of Poland, Queen of Hungary. For his service, he was granted the estate Kált in Veszprém County in 1337, which donation was confirmed by a letter of judgment for Mark and his relatives in 1354. From 1342 to 1352, Mark served as parish priest in the Saint Peter church in Buda. In 1352, he was guard in the archives of the royal chapel, and minor canon in Székesfehérvár. In that year, he applied for a benefice in the Diocese of Veszprém. Between 1353 and 1354 he was provost of Kő. In this capacity, he paid 32 florins to the papal tax collectors.

In 1355, he became canon in Székesfehérvár. Mark is first referred to as guardian (custos) of the collegiate chapter of Székesfehérvár in 1358, succeeding Demetrius. His name last appears in the dignity in 1368, another source from the next year declares the position vacant. Mark possessed a house in Székesfehérvár.

Historian András Ribi expressed his doubt that provost Mark of Kalt is identical with guardian Mark, citing several other clerics named Mark from the mid-14th-century period.

== Illuminated Chronicle ==
While writing the Chronicon Pictum, Mark either retired or died suddenly. The last illuminations were finished between 1370 and 1373. The 147 pictures of the chronicle are an inexhaustible source of information on medieval Hungarian cultural history, costume and court life, they also represent the most important records extent of Hungarian painting in the 14th century. The artistic value of the miniatures is quite high, and the characters are drawn with detail and with a knowledge of anatomy.

16th-century Renaissance writer János Baranyai Decsi was the first scholar who considered a chronicler Mark as the author of the Illuminated Chronicle in his work Syntagma issued in 1593. Historian Emil Jakubovich identified this person with Mark of Kalt and outlined his biography in his 1924 study, which was widely accepted by the Hungarian historiography.
