= Celestial Harmonies =

2001 novel by Péter Esterházy

- Book cover in original Hungarian language edition, Harmonia Caelestis (2001)
- Author: Péter Esterházy
- Original title: Harmonia Caelestis
- Language: Hungarian
- Publisher: Magvető
- Publication date: 2001
- Publication place: Hungary
- English publication date: 2004
- Pages: 712
- ISBN: 9789631421934

Celestial Harmonies (Hungarian: Harmonia Caelestis) is a 2001 novel by the Hungarian writer Péter Esterházy. The English translation by Judith Sollosy was published through Ecco Press in 2004.

== Summary ==
The work is a largely autobiographical chronicle about the author's Hungarian noble family, the Esterházys. It is divided into two parts. The first, "Numbered Sentences from the Lives of the Esterhazy Family", covers ten centuries of the family's history in short chapters or "sentences", while referring to all men in the family as "my father". The second part, "Confessions of an Esterházy Family", is about the life of the author's father and his experience of going from wealthy aristocrat to spied on labourer in communist Hungary.

== Reception ==
The Independent described the book as "a vast, interwoven web, a motet written for innumerable voices, a postmodernist thicket... oh well, a big book about Hungarian history". Publishers Weekly called it "a vast anti-epic" that comes off as a mixture of Vladimir Nabokov's Speak, Memory and Looney Tunes. The New Yorker wrote that "Esterházy’s attempt to explode epic until it resembles the shards and mirrors of his own style doesn’t quite live up to its ambition, though it yields many extraordinary moments".

== See also ==
- Harmonia Caelestis
