= Péter Esterházy =

Hungarian writer (1950–2016)

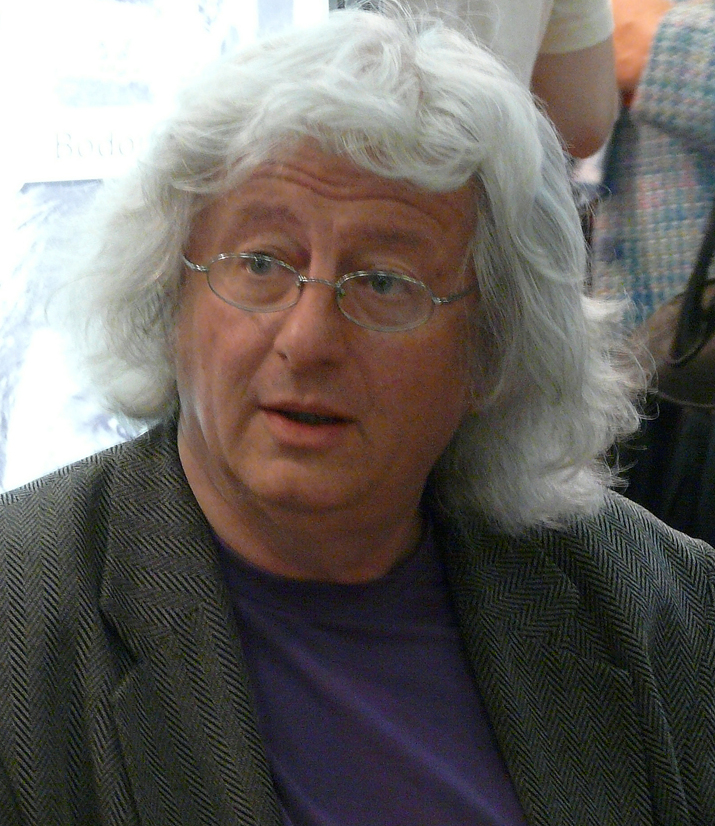
- Esterházy in 2010
- Born: 14 April 1950; Budapest, Hungary
- Died: 14 July 2016 (aged 66); Budapest, Hungary
- Education: Eötvös Loránd University
- Occupation: Author
- Spouse: Margit Reén (m. 1973)
- Children: 4
- Writing career
- Language: Hungarian
- Notable works: Celestial Harmonies (Harmonia Caelestis, 2001)
- Notable awards: Kossuth Prize

Signature
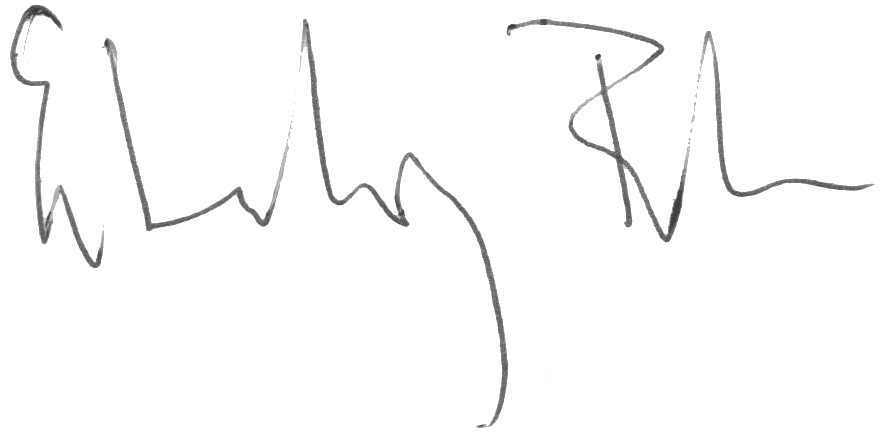

Péter Esterházy (14 April 1950 – 14 July 2016) was a Hungarian writer. He was one of the best known Hungarian and Central European writers of his era. He was called a "leading figure of 20th century Hungarian literature", and his books were considered to be significant contributions to post-war literature.

== Biography ==
Esterházy was born in Budapest on 14 April 1950, the eldest son of Mátyás Esterházy de Galántha (1919–1998) (Count Esterházy until 1947, when all titles and ranks were abolished) and Magdolna Mányoki (1916–1980). His paternal grandfather was Count Móric Esterházy (1881–1960), who briefly served as Prime Minister of Hungary in 1917. Through his paternal grandmother Countess Margit Károlyi (1896–1975), one of his ancestors was Count Gyula Károlyi (1871–1947), also Prime Minister from 1931 to 1932. Péter had three younger brothers, including international football player Márton Esterházy (born 1956).

Esterházy was educated as a mathematician and began to write in the 1970s. He is perhaps best known outside of his native country for Celestial Harmonies (Harmonia Caelestis, 2001) which chronicles his forefathers' epic rise during the Austro-Hungarian empire to their dispossession under communism. His next novel, Revised Edition or Corrected Version (Javított kiadás, 2002), which appeared as an appendix to the former work, deals with his realisation that his father was an informant for the secret police during the communist era.

After the regime change in 1989, Péter Esterházy refused to accept the return of any land or valuables nationalized by the communists.

Many of his other works also deal with the experience of living under a communist regime and in a post-communist country. He wrote in a style that can be characterised as postmodernist and his prose was described by John Updike as "jumpy, allusive, and slangy. ...there is vividness, an electric crackle. The sentences are active and concrete. Physical details leap from the murk of emotional ambivalence". In an obituary published by Reuters, his literary technique is described as "Employing a stop-and-go rhythm, his writing concentrated on twists and surprises rather than straight narrative lines, combining personal experiences with references, quotes and all shades of jokes from sarcasm to toilet humor, sometimes including texts of other authors."

His works have been published in more than 20 languages. He was awarded several literary distinctions in Hungary, including the prestigious Kossuth Prize in 1996, and has received awards for his work in France, Austria, Germany, Slovenia and Poland.

He was highly critical of the authoritarian tendencies of Viktor Orbán's administration, declaring that "Orbán is not a statesman" and that "the Orbán system is damaging to Hungary. Our Democracy is not liberal, freedom of the press is limited, and the division of power is inadequate."

He was married to Margit Reén, and had four children.

In October 2015, it became public knowledge that he was suffering from pancreatic cancer. He died on 14 July 2016.

== Ancestry ==
Ancestors of Péter Esterházy

8. Count Miklós Esterházy de Galántha et Fraknó
4. Count Móric Esterházy de Galántha et Fraknó
9. Princess Franziska zu Schwarzenberg
2. Mátyás Esterházy
10. Count Gyula Károlyi de Nagykároly
5. Countess Margit Károlyi de Nagykároly
11. Countess Ermelinde Károlyi de Nagykároly
1. Péter Esterházy
6. Josef Mányoki
3. Magdolna Mányoki
7. Irene Moldoványi

== Works published in English ==
(The italicized dates refer to original publication, other dates refer to the English-language publications.)

- Helping Verbs of the Heart (A szív segédigéi, 1985, 1990, 1991, 1996)
- The Transporters (Fuharosok, 1983, 1991, 1994)
- The Book of Hrabal (Hrabal könyve, 1990, 1993, 1994, 1996)
- The Glance of Countess Hahn-Hahn (Down the Danube) (Hahn-Hahn grófnő pillantása, 1991, 1994, 1998, 1999)
- She loves me (Egy nő, 1993, 1994, 1997, 1998)
- A Little Hungarian Pornography (Kis Magyar Pornográfia, 1984, 1995, 1997)
- Celestial Harmonies: A Novel (Harmonia Caelestis, 2001, 2004)
- Not Art (Semmi művészet, 2008, 2010)

== International awards ==
- Ordre des Arts et des Lettres, France
- Order of Cultural Merit (ro:Ordinul „Meritul Cultural” (România)), Romania
- Austrian State Prize for European Literature, Austria
- Herder Prize, Austria and Germany
- Vilenica Prize, Slovenia
- Peace Prize of the German Book Trade, Germany
- Angelus Award, Poland
- Premio Mondello, Italy
- International Masi Grosso d'Oro Veneziano Prize, Italy

== Membership ==
- Deutsche Akademie für Sprache und Dichtung (Darmstadt)
- Akademie der Künste (Berlin)

== Bibliography ==
- Tötösy de Zepetnek, Steven (斯蒂文·托托西演). 文学研究的合法化: 一种新实用主义 ·整体化和经主 义文学与文化研究方法 (Legitimizing the Study of Literature: A New Pragmatism and the Systemic Approach to Literature and Culture). Trans. Ma Jui-ch'i (马瑞琪翻). Beijing: Peking University Press, 1997. 111–134.
- Tötösy de Zepetnek, Steven. "Cultures, Peripheralities, and Comparative Literature." Comparative Literature: Theory, Method, Application. By Steven Tötösy de Zepetnek. Amsterdam: Rodopi, 1998. 121–175.
