= János Baranyai Decsi =

Hungarian Renaissance writer

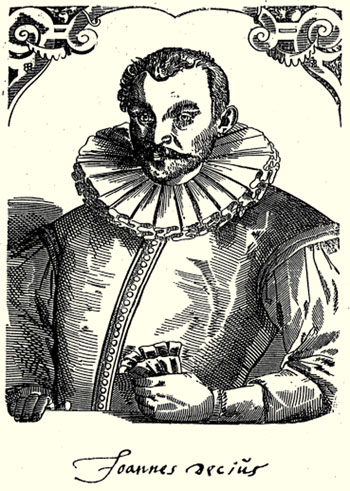
János Baranyai Decsi

János Baranyai Decsi or János Csimor Baranyai Decsi (Hungarian: Baranyai Decsi Csimor János) is a Hungarian Renaissance writer who lived in the 16th century. He lived in the Transylvanian court of Báthory Zsigmond.

== Life ==
He was born in Decs in Ottoman Hungary in 1560. His family name was Csimor. He belonged to the Calvinist Church.

He completed his studies in Tolna, Debrecen and Kolozsvár (now Cluj-Napoca). In 1587, he travelled abroad accompanying the young Hungarian aristocrat, Ferenc Bánffy de Losoncz. The pair studied in Wittenberg, where Bánffy was elected as rector.

In 1590, they moved to Strasbourg. The family estate had been ruined by the Ottoman Turks. In 1592, he moved to Kolozsvár (now Cluj-Napoca), where the Duke, Sigismund Báthory supported him. The following year, he moved to Marosvásárhely (now Târgu Mureş) where he began working as a teacher, which he held until his death.

He travelled a great deal, to Gyulafehérvár (Alba Iulia), to Kolozsvár (now Cluj-Napoca), and once even to Strasbourg to be granted a higher degree.

== History of Hungary 1592–1598 ==
Baranyai was close to the official documents of the Transylvanian court, he mentions as informators Márton Pethe, Demeter Naprágyi, Ferenc Dersffy, Sebestyén Thököly, László Hommonai, Miklós Czobor. He even interviewed the beg of Lippa (now Lipova) Mohamed in prison.

His source for earlier periods is often Antonio Bonfini. His relation to the Catholic duke was contradictory; on the one hand Baranyai needed the prince's support to finance his own work, but Baranyai often spoke out against what he perceived as the duke's crimes and impotence in military or political matters. He often quotes the facts without commentary.

The work would copy Antonio Bonfini in its structure, written in the form of the ten decades of Hungarian history but Baranyai only wrote the tenth decade, which turned out to be similar.

First editions are of Marton Kovachich 1798 and of Ferenc Toldy in 1866.

== Works ==
- Hungarian translation of Sallust's Catilina, Iugurtha published in 1609
- Hodoeporicon
- History of Hungary 1592–1598
- Poems in Latin and Greek
- Thesis on the Hunnic-Scythian alphabet
- Hungarian translation of Erasmus of Rotterdam's proverb collection
- Essay on the Hungarian Law "Syntagma institutinonum iuris imperialis ac Ungarici" published 1593 in Kolozsvár

== Literature ==
Baranyi Decsi János magyar historiája (1592–1598) Budapest 1981 Helikon translated from Latin by Kulcsár Péter
