= Bible translations into Hungarian =

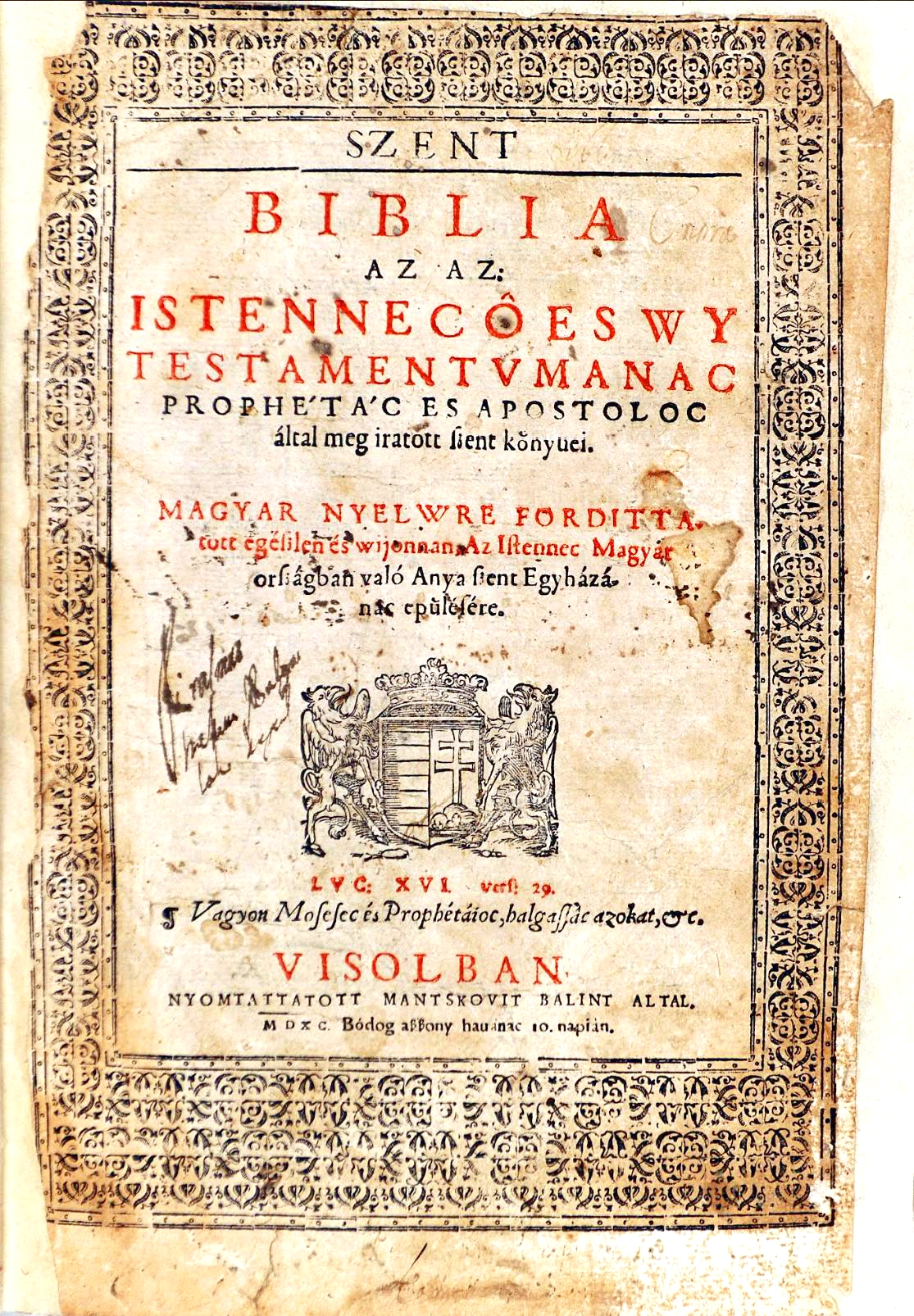
Vizsoly Bible (1590)

The first Bible translations into Hungarian date from the 15-16th centuries, as do the first Hussite Bible and the Vizsoly Bible.

== Translations ==
- Hussite Bible is the first Hungarian translation of the Bible, and it dates back to 1416. It was translated by Tamás Pécsi and Bálint Újlaki, two Hussite Hungarian priests, who studied in Prague between 1399 and 1411.
- Újszövetség (New Testament) is the first surviving complete version of the New Testament in Hungarian. It was translated by János Sylvester in 1541. It was also the first book printed in Hungary, at the estate of the Tamás Nádasdy in Sárvár.
- Vizsoly Bible is the first surviving complete version of the Bible in Hungarian. It was translated by Gáspár Károli, a Calvinist pastor in 1590. It is named after the village of Vizsoly and was printed in 700-800 copies originally, gained popularity and is occasionally used even today as the "classic" translation (similarly to the KJV in English). It was revised several times, the 1908 edition being widely adopted.
- Káldi Bible is the first complete Catholic version of the Bible in Hungarian. It was translated by György Káldy in 1626 and was printed in Vienna. It has been revised several times, most recently in 1997.
- Szent István Társulati Biblia (Saint Stephen Society Bible): Catholic (1973)
- Bible of the Magyar Bibliatársulat (Hungarian Bible Society): Protestant (1975)
- Bible of the Szent Jeromos Bibliatársulat: (Saint Jerome Bible Society): Catholic and based on Káldi's translation and the Nova Vulgata (1997)
- Hungarian version of the New World Translation: Jehovah's Witnesses (2003)

== Comparison ==
Translation	John (János) 3:16
Hussite Bible (1416)	Mert így szerette Isten a világot, hogy ő Fiát eggyetlen egy szülöttet adná, hogy menden, ki hiszen őbele, el ne veszjen, de vallja az örök életet.
Vizsoly Bible (1590)	Mert úgy szerette Isten e világot, hogy az ő egyszülött Fiát adta, hogy valaki hiszen ő benne, el ne vesszen, hanem örök élete legyen.
Káldi Biblia (1626)	Mert úgy szerette Isten e világot, hogy az ő egyszülött Fiát adta, hogy mindaz, aki őbenne hisz, el ne vesszen, hanem örök élete legyen.
Szent István Társulati Biblia (1973)	Mert úgy szerette Isten a világot, hogy egyszülött Fiát adta oda, hogy aki hisz benne, az el ne vesszen, hanem örökké éljen.
Magyar Bibliatársulat (1975)	Mert úgy szerette Isten a világot, hogy egyszülött Fiát adta, hogy aki hisz őbenne, el ne vesszen, hanem örök élete legyen.
Szent Jeromos Bibliatársulat (1997)	Mert úgy szerette Isten a világot, hogy egyszülött Fiát adta, hogy mindaz, aki őbenne hisz, el ne vesszen, hanem örök élete legyen.
Hungarian version of the New World Translation (2017)	Mert Isten annyira szerette a világot, hogy az egyszülött Fiát adta, hogy aki hisz benne, ne pusztuljon el, hanem örök élete legyen.
