= Albert Szenczi Molnár =

Hungarian Calvinist pastor, linguist, philosopher, poet, religious writer and translator

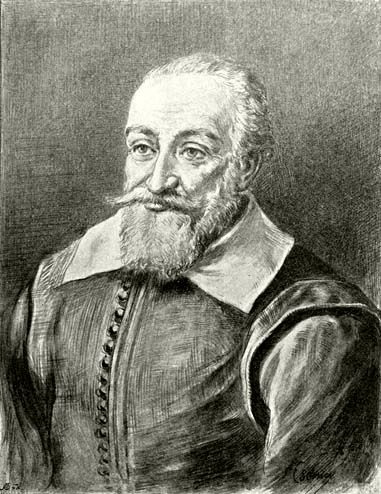
- Albert Szenczi Molnár, 1624
- Born: Albert Molnár; 30 August 1574; Szenc, Hungary
- Died: 17 January 1634 (aged 59); Kolozsvár, Transylvania
- Occupations: Pastor, author, theologian, translator
- Notable work: Hanau Bible
- Theological work
- Tradition or movement: Reformed, Calvinism

Albert Szenczi Molnár (30 August 1574 – 17 January 1634) was a Hungarian Calvinist pastor, linguist, philosopher, poet, religious writer and translator.

Although he lived the largest part of his life abroad (Wittenberg, Strassburg, Heidelberg, Altdorf, Marburg and Oppenheim) and the majority of his work was born there, Albert Szenczi Molnár contributed his work to the benefit of his country. Quoting his friends he wrote in one of his letters:

Everybody says and confirms that by publishing a single dictionary, being longed for by the whole studentship in Hungary, I can serve my country a lot more than by teaching the youth and vicarage for some years.

His pioneering Latin-Hungarian dictionaries (Dictionarium Latinovngaricvm and Dictionarivm Vngarico-Latinvm, both 1604), were, with several revisions, still in use until the first half of the 19th century. He defined much literary and scientific terminology in the Hungarian language for the first time. His Hungarian grammar in Latin (Nova Grammatica Ungarica) was used as a guidebook until the 18th century, through which – apart from its significance in the history of science – his work greatly contributed to the unification of Hungarian language and spelling. His Psalm translations, the revised editions of the Vizsoly Bible, John Calvin's Institutes of the Christian Religion and the Heidelberg Catechism all represent living heritage. He had an outstanding influence on Hungarian literature and poetry.

== Career ==
His great-grandfather came from Székely Land and fought in the siege of Naples as a soldier of Matthias Corvinus. After the siege he settled in Pozsony County. He named his son according to his occupation as Molitoris, so Molnár. This was the name also of his grandson, who was the father of Albert Szenczi Molnár and lived in the market town of Szenc (today: Senec, Slovakia) and worked as a mason miller. At the time of Albert's birth his father was quite rich but soon he became poor. After his death in 1603 his family lived in extreme poverty.

Albert Molnár began his studies in his hometown on 7 September 1584. After the death of his mother in 1585 he was studying in Győr for five months, for one and a half years starting from 1587 in Gönc, and finally from 1588 until the summer of 1590 in Debrecen. In Gönc as the company of Gáspár Károli he was present at the translation and printing of the Vizsoly Bible. In Debrecen István Csorba was his teacher.

In 1590 at first he was a preceptor in Kassa (today: Košice, Slovakia), and then on 1 November he went on a field trip abroad. First of all he visited the birthplace of reformation, Wittenberg. In the summer of 1591 he studied in Dresden in the Holy Cross high school (Gymnasium zum Heiligen Kreuz), in autumn again in Wittenberg, and finally in Heidelberg in 1592. On 1 May he travelled to Strasbourg, where he was accepted to the Collegium Wilhelmiticum as an alumnus. In the summer of 1596 he visited Geneva, where he met the elderly Theodore Beza. When returning to Strasbourg he continued his studies, but in the same year due to his Calvinism, he was banished from that Lutheran town. He returned to Germany only after a long journey in Switzerland and Italy. On 4 December 1596 he was accepted to the Casimirianum at Heidelberg as a student of theology. On 22 January 1597 he matriculated to university, where he studied until 1599.

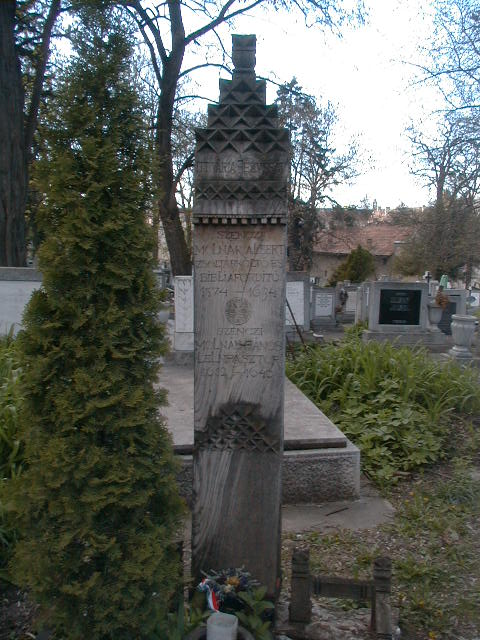
Grave of Szenczi Molnár (Cimitirul Hajongard, Cluj-Napoca)

At the end of October 1599, after nine years of wandering abroad he returned home to obtain patrons among the Protestant nobility. He stayed in Szenc until 1600, and traveled all around Upper Hungary. In March 1600 he went back to Germany, and turned up in several cities (Altdorf, Heidelberg, Speyer, and Frankfurt). Since 23 November he studied in Herborn (Hesse). He got his certificate from Johannes Piscator on 19 July 1601 who wanted him to be a teacher of the institution, but it was not possible. In 1601 he worked as a proofreader for Johannes Saur's publishing house, and in 1602 as a tutor in Amberg. On 23 January he enrolled to the University of Altdorf and started writing his Latin-Hungarian dictionary. He gave the first part of the dictionary to Rudolf II, Holy Roman Emperor, and when the book was published he traveled to Prague to show it to the monarch personally. Here he received respectable honor and was welcomed by many people, including Johannes Kepler. The emperor's advisers wanted him to convert to the Roman Catholic religion, so they sent him to University of Vienna with 50 Forints reimbursing his traveling expenses. When Stephen Bocskay's War of Independence broke out he returned to the Holy-Roman Empire.

In Germany he was patronized by two Protestant monarchs, Elector Palatine Frederick IV and Maurice, Landgrave of Hesse-Kassel. In 1606 in Heidelberg Frederick ordered an alimentation for him at the teachers' desk, and from 1607 to 1611 was given bed and board by Maurice at his own expense in Marburg. Szenczi wrote his Hungarian grammar (1604) for Maurice who spoke Hungarian and was highly educated, and published it again in 1611 extended with a Greek glossary. His psalm translations also appeared in this period, as well as the Heidelberg Catechism (1607), and the Hanau Bible (1608), which is the revised version of the Vizsoly Bible. On 8 October 1611 he married Kunigunda von Ferinar from Luther's family who was the ex-wife of a teacher called Conrad Vietor. They had 2 sons and 4 daughters (1612, John Albert, 1614: Elizabeth, 1617 Mary Magdalene, 1618, Paul, 1620: Elizabeth Kunigunda, 1623: Mary Elizabeth). Probably in 1611–12 he worked as a proofreader in Oppenheim. In 1612 a week after of his son's baptism he left to Hungary, where he attended the synod of Köveskút.

For a while he worked as a printing supervisor in his wife's birthplace in Oppenheim. Then in 1613 he moved to Hungary with his family, where he worked as a pastor, at first in Városszalónak and then in Rohonc. Since he did not manage to establish a printer's workshop there, he made himself invited who appointed him as a professor of the college in Gyulafehérvár (today: Alba Iulia, Romania), but because of his family he moved back to Germany. According to art historian Samu Benkő it is conceivable that Szenczi performed a diplomatic mission for Gabriel Bethlen: the monarch wanted to get in touch with the Protestant Union that way. Szenczi was appointed as a cantor of the church of Saint Sebastian in October 1615, as well as a teacher of the school, then in 1617 its rector by the son of his old patron Frederick V, Elector Palatine. By his administrative job he continued his work with the Hungarian Calvinistic literature.

Due to the Thirty Years' War he lost his home, and moved to the royal court in Heidelberg. The city was ravaged by Count Tilly's soldiers after the Battle of White Mountain; Szenczi was also pillaged and tortured, so he decided to migrate to Hanau. Here he published the translated edition of the Institutes of the Christian Religion commissioned by Gabriel Bethlen. After a trip to Netherlands he got an invitation from Bethlen again in 1624, so he finally returned home. Since 1625 he lived in Kassa and since 1629 in Kolozsvár (today: Cluj-Napoca, Romania). During his subsequent stay in Hungary he lived in poverty and was later completely forgotten. The new monarch George I Rákóczi did not support him effectively. In January 1634 he died of plague. A Latin poem by Johann Heinrich Bisterfeld is engraved on his tombstone.

== Bibliography ==
- Benkő, Samu: "Barátságos emberség tündöklése." In Szenci Molnár Albert: Napló és más írások. (ed. Benkő, Samu). Bucharest, Kriterion, 1984. pp. 5–71.
- C. Vladár, Zsuzsa: "Pereszlényi Pál nyelvtanának terminusairól." Magyar Nyelv, Vol. XCVII, Issue 4. (Dec. 2001) pp. 467–479.
- C. Vladár, Zsuzsa: "Hány eset van a magyarban?: Egy XVII. századi kritériumrendszer." Magyar Nyelv, Vol. CV, Issue 3. (Sept. 2009) pp. 281–290.
- Dézsi, Lajos: Szenczi Molnár Albert: 1574–1633. Budapest, Magyar Történelmi Társulat, 1897.
- Giebermann, Gerriet: Albert Molnár (1574–1634), ungarischer reformierter Theologe und Wandergelehrter, 1615–1619 Kantor und Rektor in Oppenheim. [Oppenheim]: Oppenheimer Geschichtsverein, 2005. pp. 2–100. = Oppenheimer Hefte, 30/31.
- Herepei, János: "Szenczi Molnár Albert halála ideje." Erdélyi Múzeum, Vol. XXXVIII, 1933. Issue 10–12. pp. 464–468.
- Nagy, Géza: A református egyház története 1608–1715. Vol. I. Máriabesnyő–Gödöllő, Attraktor, 2008. = Historia Incognita, 22. ISBN 978 963 9580 96 1
- Petrőczi, Éva: "Szenczi Molnár Albert és a Biblia – Szenczi Molnár Albert bibliái." In Petrőczi, Éva: Puritánia: Tanulmányok a magyar és angol puritanizmus történetéből. Budapest, Universitas, 2006. pp. 52–59. ISBN 963 9671 02 9
- P. Vásárhelyi, Judit: Szenczi Molnár Albert és a Vizsolyi Biblia új kiadásai. Budapest: Universitas. 2006. = Historia Litteraria, 21. ISBN 963 9671 03 7
- Szathmári, István: "Mennyiben szolgálták Szenczi Molnár Albert szótárai a magyar irodalmi nyelv (sztenderd) létrejöttét?" Magyar Nyelvőr, Vol. CXXXI, Issue 2, 2007. pp. 163–172.
- Szathmári, István: "Szenczi Molnár Albert zsoltárai és a magyar irodalmi nyelv." Magyar Nyelv, Vol. CIII. Issue 4. (Dec. 2007) pp. 399–407.
- Szenczi Molnár, Albert: Napló és más írások. (ed. Benkő, Samu). Bucharest, Kriterion, 1984.
- Zoványi, Jenő: Magyarországi protestáns egyháztörténeti lexikon. Ed. Ladányi, Sándor. 3rd edition. Budapest, Magyarországi Református Egyház Zsinati Irodája, 1977. ISBN 963-7030-15-8
