= Hussite Bible =

Oldest known Hungarian and Uralic Bible translation

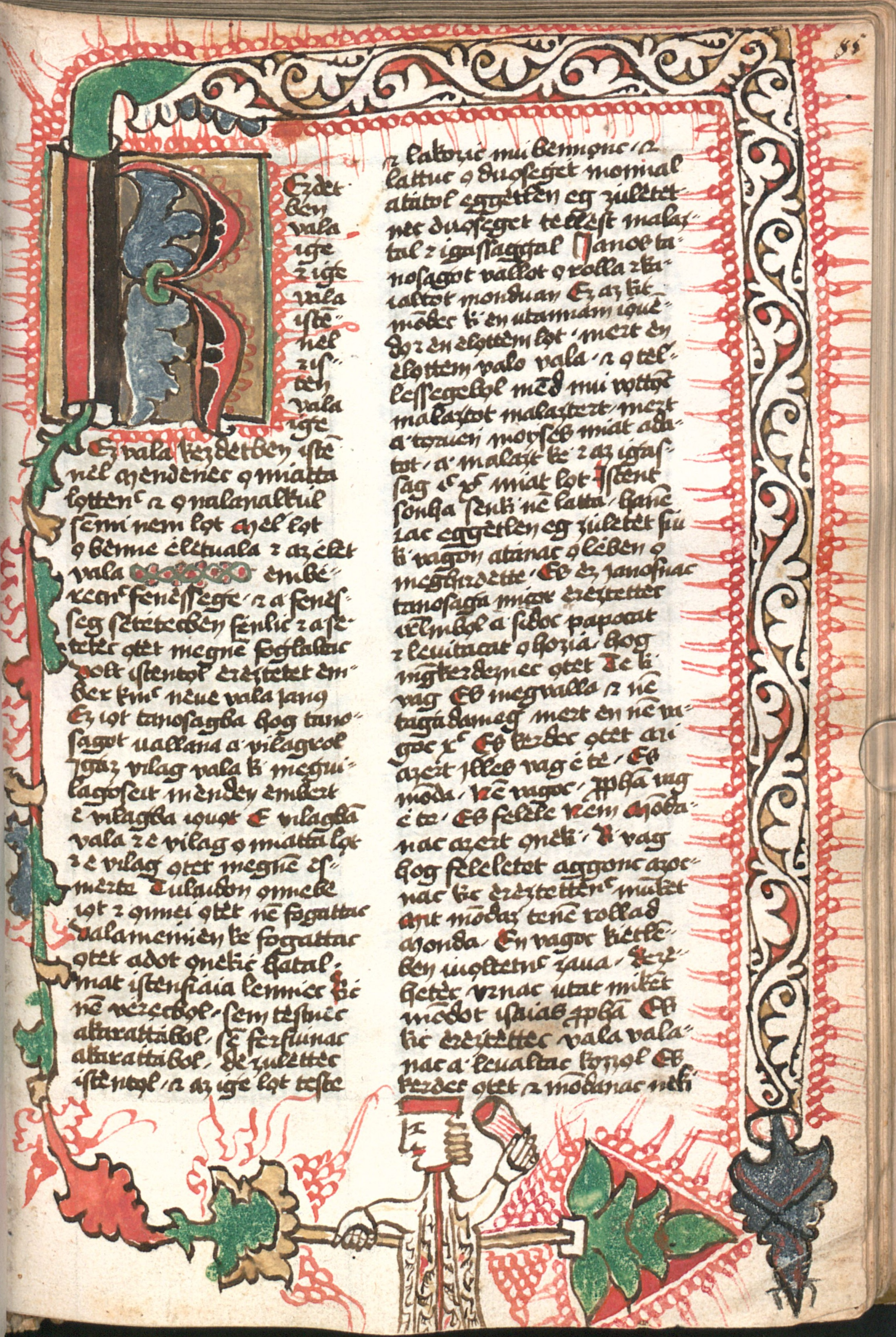
The Codex of Munich, open at the first page of the New Testament

The Hussite Bible (Hungarian: Huszita Biblia; sometimes also "The Bible of the Franciscans") is the oldest known Hungarian, as well as a general Uralic Bible translation, dated to the 1420s–1430s.

== History ==
The Hussite Bible is the only written vestige of Hussitism in Hungary. The book – or at least most of it – was translated by Tamás Pécsi and Bálint Újlaki. Both Pécsi and Újlaki had attended the University of Prague in Bohemia between 1399 and 1411, where they got to know the concepts of Jan Hus, a reformist Christian theologian. Concluded from the calendar found in the Codex of Munich, the two Franciscan priests may already have begun the work in 1416 in the town of Sremska Kamenica which was at the time a center of Hussitism. They finished it at the latest in 1441. Pécsi had to escape soon from Hungary due to the Inquisition, thus he and many of his followers moved to Moldavia. They had been unsuccessful: the translation was confiscated.

The original manuscript is not known, most likely it perished. Most texts of the Hussite Bible were revealed from partial copies. The most important extant copies of this translation are the Codex of Munich, the Codex of Wien, and the Apor Codex. Some other, shorter parts had been transcribed to other Hungarian dialects as well; these can be found in other 15th century Hungarian codices.

== Features ==
=== Vocabulary ===
The translation's language is archaic, with many terms unknown in Modern Hungarian. Also, it contains several rare Old Hungarian words, thus providing an interesting insight into the Hungarian language at the time. These include (with Modern Hungarian equivalent and English translation in parentheses): monnál (mintegy, or so), midenem (nemde, is it right?), csajva (cserebogár, cockchafer), gördőlet (mennydörgés, thunder), etc.

In some respects, the Hussite Bible's translators were the first reformers of Hungarian: they coined several new terms, which today sound constrained. Some examples: császárlat (imperium), czímerlet (titulus), ezerlő (tribunus), negyedlő (tetrarch), and so on.

=== Orthography ===
The Bible's orthography was influenced by early 15th century Czech spelling. Pécsi and Újlaki adopted the system of writing special sounds with diacritic marks. (i. e, writing [ɲ] with ń, or [ɛː] with è, etc.)

This orthography later spread among the Hungarian Franciscan friars as well, and had a great influence on spelling in 16th-century Hungarian printed books. However, the modern Hungarian alphabet has different origins.

== Copies ==
=== Codex of Wien ===
The oldest of the copies is the Codex of Wien. It contains parts of the Old Testament. The codex has 162 pages, each with a size of 216 by 142 millimetres. The book is the work of three hands from the second half of the 15th century. Since the 18th century, the manuscript has been kept in Vienna (Wien in German), its earlier place is unknown. In 1932, it was moved to the National Széchenyi Library's Section of Manuscripts, Budapest, where it can be found today as well.

=== Codex of Munich ===
The Codex of Munich consists of 124 pages, and contains the four Gospels. Its size is 135 by 200 millimetres. The whole manuscript had been written by György Németi, who finished the work in Târgu Trotuș, in the year 1466 AD.

It is unknown where the codex was after its completion. The first page shows a reference to Johann Albrecht Widmannstetter(1506–1557) as an early owner, who was a philologist and book collector. After his death, the manuscript was transferred to the Bavarian State Library, where it is kept still today, in excellent condition.

A complete facsimile was published in 1958, as part of the Ural-Altaische Bibliothek (Ural-Altaic Library).

=== Apor Codex ===
The Apor codex got its name after its former owner, the Apor family. It is colligatum. Once it contained 208 pages, but 92 perished, and only 116 remained, the first 21 of which are badly damaged. Because of humid storage circumstances, other pages were harmed as well. Its size is 208 by 140 millimetres.

== See also ==
- Codex of Bécs
- Protestant Bible
- Hungarian language
- History of Hungarian

== Bibliography ==
- József Molnár - Györgyi Simon: Magyar nyelvemlékek. 3rd edition, Budapest, 1980. ISBN 963-17-4738-7
