= Vizsoly Bible =

First Bible printed in Hungarian language

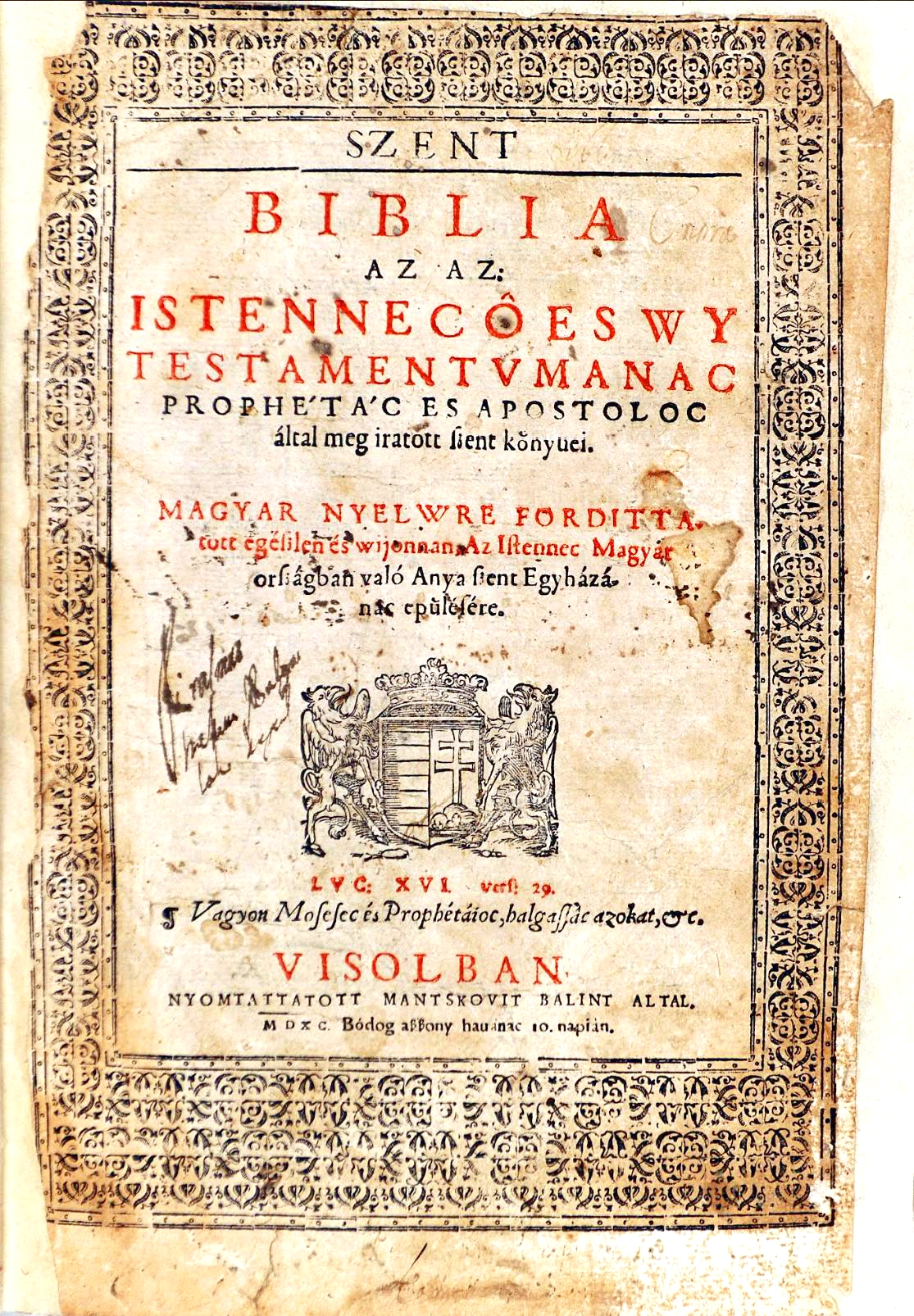
The Vizsoly Bible (1590)

The Vizsoly Bible, also called Károli Bible was the first Bible printed in the Hungarian language. It was translated in the 16th century by pastor Gáspár Károli and fellow Calvinists and was printed in 1590 by Bálint Mantskovit. A copy is kept on permanent display in the Hungarian village of Vizsoly.

== History ==
Gáspár Károli, Calvinist pastor in the town of Gönc, began working on the translation in 1586 and finished it three years later. Since it would have been impossible for one person to translate the complete Bible in such a short time, others must have worked on it too; examination of the vocabulary and phrases used suggests that at least four people worked on it but the New Testament was translated by Károli in its entirety.

Printing began on February 28, 1589 by Bálint Mantskovit who moved his press from Galgóc to Vizsoly. He imported type from the Netherlands and paper from Poland. Mantskovit was of Polish origin, and in a note he asks the reader to overlook the errors he possibly left in the text. When printing began, the full translation was not ready yet, so Károli's manuscripts were taken page by page to Mantskovit by students at Gönc, among them Albert Szenczi Molnár.

On March 3, 1589 Archduke Ernest and the royal secretary Faustus Verantius accused Manstkovit of printing calendars and other forbidden books, and asked for the press to be confiscated. On March 26, Sigismund Rákóczi, the future Prince of Transylvania, to whose estate Vizsoly belonged, denied the accusations and asked to be allowed to finish the printing of the Bible. Thanks to Rákóczi and other powerful nobles supporting the cause, the printing was finished on July 20, 1590. Around 700–800 copies of the book were printed during this time.

== The book ==
Károli names his sources in the foreword: the Vulgata, the Septuaginta, translations and commentaries by Franciscus Vatablus, Sebastian Münster, Santes Pagninus and Immanuel Tremellius; he also used the Hebrew and Greek texts. It is not clear to what extent he utilized earlier, incomplete Hungarian translations; he does refer to those of Gáspár Heltai and Péter Melius Juhász, and he used the translation of Psalm 74 by István Székely.

The book has 2,412 pages and weighs about 6 kg. It consists of three volumes. The first volume, with the coat of arms of Hungary on its cover, includes the first 28 books of the Old Testament, with a table of contents and a lengthy foreword by Károli addressed to “the lords and heroic nobles, God-fearing communities, preachers in Hungary and in Transylvania” and is dated January 1, 1589. The second volume includes the remaining books of the Old Testament, while the third volume is the “New Testament of our Lord Jesus Christ”, including a large folded-in page with Jesus's genealogy.

Károli also included short summaries and commentaries before each chapter, explaining some of the verses with parallels to situations that were well known in the period. For example, to the Take off your sandals! part he added the following commentary: “Just like the Turks are known to take off their boots when entering their churches; it is done as a sign of respect for the place” – aspects of Islamic culture were well known in Hungary during the Ottoman wars in Europe, when the borders of the Ottoman Empire reached as far as Abaúj County.

Károli was aware that the translation was not without errors, as he wrote in the foreword:

I don't doubt that this work of ours, after it becomes known among people, will be envied and slandered. For just as the body is followed by the shadow, virtue, by which I mean good deeds, is followed by envy. And those who are born to slander, since they are unable to do deeds or create works similar to those of others, slander them if they cannot do more harm to them. But I care not for the envy and slanders, for as God and my good conscience are my witnesses, I've done this for nothing else but the glory of God and I had only the strengthening of His house in view.

He asks all Christian readers not to scold him for his errors, but to pinpoint them to him, so that he can correct them. His death shortly after the first publication prevented him from revising his translation. In 1608 a former student, Albert Szenczi Molnár, published a revised edition known as the Hanau Bible.

== The Bibles today ==
Only 51 copies of the Vizsoly Bible exist today. Károli possessed twenty of them at the time of his death. Twenty of the fifty-one surviving copies are in Hungary, fourteen are in Romania (Transylvania), thirteen in Slovakia, two in the Czech Republic, one in Austria and one in Denmark.

On November 28, 2003 an almost intact copy was sold at a Budapest auction for 12 million forints (US$53,571), although experts assessed its value at 25–30 million forints; at another auction in London it reached that price in 2001. In May 2008 an Old Testament in good condition was auctioned for 2.2 million forints. In 1981, 28,000 copies of the Bible were reprinted.

A copy has been exhibited in the church of Vizsoly since October 31, 1940. After several pages had been stolen, the book was then secured in a glass display case. On February 10, 2002 it was stolen again, and found in September 2003 in a neglected building in Komárno, Slovakia. It is occasionally lent for exhibitions and was on display in the House of Tokay Wines in Tokaj between August 13 and September 3, 2008.

== Location of the Bibles ==
A list of libraries and institutions owning a Vizsoly Bible. Several of them can be viewed on request.

Hungary

- Budapest, National Széchényi Library (3 copies)
- Budapest, Library of the Hungarian Academy of Sciences (4, three of them have about 10% of the book missing, while one is a fragment with less than 50% intact)
- Budapest, Library of ELTE (1)
- Debrecen, Library of Tiszántúl Protestant Diocese (2, a third one was illegally sold in the 1950s)
- Debrecen, University and National Library (1, incomplete, transferred from the Széchényi National Library in 1956)
- Kalocsa, Library of the Archdiocese of Kalocsa (1, Old Testament only)
- Kecskemét, Library of the Diocese of Kecskemét (1)
- Miskolc, Minorite monastic quarters
- Sárospatak, Library of the Roman Catholic Ecclesiastical Collection
- Sárospatak, Library of the Protestant College
- Sopron, Archives of the Lutheran Church
- Szeged
- Vizsoly, Protestant church (1)

Romania

- Alba Iulia (2)
- Cluj-Napoca, Academy Library
- Cluj-Napoca, University Library
- Sighetu Marmaţiei
- Târgu Mureş

Slovakia

- Bratislava, Ústredná knižnica Slovenskej akadémie vied (1, Old Testament only)
- Bratislava, academy
- Bratislava, university
- Jasov
- Košice, Štátna vedecká knižnica (2, the authenticity of one of them is debated)
- Oponice
- Prešov
- Rožňava
- Sabinov
- Topoľčianky

Other

- Olomouc (2)
- Vienna (1)
- Copenhagen, Royal Library, Denmark (1)
