= Péter Melius Juhász =

Péter Melius Juhász (1532 – 25 December 1572) was a Hungarian botanist, writer, theologist, and bishop of the Calvinist Reformed Church in Transylvania. He famously debated with Ferenc David in a series of synods resulting in the Brief Confession of Pastors at Debrecen (1567), the Confession of Kassa (1568), and the Várad disputation (18 August 1568) - held at "Várad", modern Nagyvárad (Romanian Oradea), not Várad in Hungary. The "sententia catholica," was followed by a new confession, the Confession of Várad (1568).

Gáspár Károli names Melius as one of the sources for his translation of the Hungarian Vizsoly Bible.

His herbal (Herbarium), published in 1578, was the first botanical and medicinal work in Hungarian language.

== Works ==
- Herbarivm. Az faknac fvveknec nevekröl, termésetekröl, és haßnairól, Magyar nyelwre, és ez rendre hoßta az Doctoroc Kőnyueiből az Horhi Melius Peter. Nyomtattot Coloſuárat Heltai Gaſpárné Műhellyébé, 1. 5. 78. Eßtendőben.
