= Vienna Codex =

Several codices are known simply as "Vienna Codex" in certain fields:

- Codex Vindobonensis 795, a 9th-century manuscript that contains letters and treatises by Alcuin, including a discussion of the Gothic alphabet and a description of the Anglo-Saxon futhorc
- Vienna Codex (Hungarian) (1450)
- Vienna Codex (Aztec)
- Vienna Dioscurides, an early 6th-century illuminated manuscript of De Materia Medica by Dioscorides in Greek
