= Magyar szótár =

Magyar szótár (A Dictionary of the Hungarian Language) is a Hungarian language reference work by Hungarian translator Tibor Bartos published in 2002 by Corvina publishing house. It is a cross of a dictionary of synonyms and a thesaurus. Rather than relying on methods of computational linguistics, the vocabulary has been compiled manually as a by-product of translation work done by the author over his lifelong career as a translator of literary works.

Volume One is the dictionary itself, while Volume Two is an alphabetical index of words contained therein.

The subtitle explains the nature of the work as: “A repertory of words and phrases explaining each other, Book 1 and 2.” Though he does not use the word recursion, the whole project is a study on recursion in the Hungarian language.

== Bartos’ credo ==
"Words are not synonyms on their own. What happens is, that we, speaking the same language, “match make them” every day... You never look for a word by locating it as a vector diagram in a system theory... The latest edition of Encyclopædia Britannica does not even waste space for synonyms... The ambition to locate the appropriate word for the correct use of language is sought no more..."

Perhaps that was written in anticipation of the criticism published before his dictionary was actually published, on behalf of the professional lexicographers and taxonomists, such as Rudolf Ungvári, an authority in preparing thesauri in Hungarian, protesting the advent of "an outsider” in lexicography or taxonomy. But by the token of his original degree in ethnography or cultural anthropology Tibor Bartos, not to mention his tremendous amount of superb translation of literary works, is undoubtedly an authentic person to turn to when having problems with putting the right Hungarian words together in composition, translation or originating other ideas in writing to meet different stylistic criteria. It is another issue though that the representation of his knowledge is not in par with the output of NLP technology available today.

== Biography ==
Tibor Bartos was born in Újpest, Hungary, on August 1, 1933. He graduated from Idegen Nyelvek Főiskolája and was working between 1954 and 1965 as an editor of Európa Könyvkiadó. He translated works by Albee, Arde, Barthelme, Becket, Behan, Bierce, Capote, Cary, Chesterton, Delillo, Dickens, Dos Passos, George Eliot, Ellison, Franklin, Fussel, Hagen, Hardy, John Irving, Kerouac, Kesey, D. Lessig, Oscar Lewis, London, Macdonald, MacLeish, Malz, Matthiessen, H. Miller, Moyes, O'Henry, Pinter, Pirsi, Poe, Roddenberry, Rosengarten, Stoker, Styron, Swinburne, Thackeray, Thurber, Updike, Vivian, Warren, Wesker, Tom Wolfe and Wongar. His awards include Wessely László díj (1981) and Év Könyve (1985). He died on 26 March 2010, after long illness.

== Contents ==
=== Book One ===
1. Szótár-magyarázó (Rationale)
2. Fogalomkörei (The broad concepts or categories grouped under numbers)
3. Hogyan forgassuk (Guide to browsing)
4. Tár (List of words and phrases)

=== Book Two ===
1. Betűrendes eligazítás (Alphabetic index)

== See also ==
- ISBN 963 13 5137 8
