= Szabadkai Friss Újság =

Hungarian daily newspaper

Szabadkai Friss Újság (lit. Subotican Fresh News) was a Hungarian language daily newspaper. The first issue of Szabadkai Friss Újság was published on March 2, 1901, with the purpose of serving as the information source for the Magyars and Hungarian language-speaking population in Bács-Bodrog County within the Kingdom of Hungary in Austria-Hungary. It was published in Subotica (today in Serbia). Its editor-in-chief was Béla Pusztai. Szabadkai Friss Újság was disestablished in 1921.

== See also ==
- Hungarians in Vojvodina

== External references ==
- (Hungarian) Kosztolányi Dezső emlékoldal - Bácskai lapok.1 Sajtótörténeti háttér a Forrásjegyzék 2. kötetéhez
- (Hungarian) Születésnapi Újság, születésnapi újságok, régi újság minta ajándék ...
- (Hungarian) Szabadka városfejlődése 1700 és 1910 között
- (Hungarian) LÉTÜNK - TÁRSADALOM, TUDOMÁNY, KULTÚRA, 2002.1-2
