= National Széchényi Library =

Library in Budapest, Hungary

Coordinates: 47°29′42″N 19°2′21″E

- Országos Széchényi Könyvtár
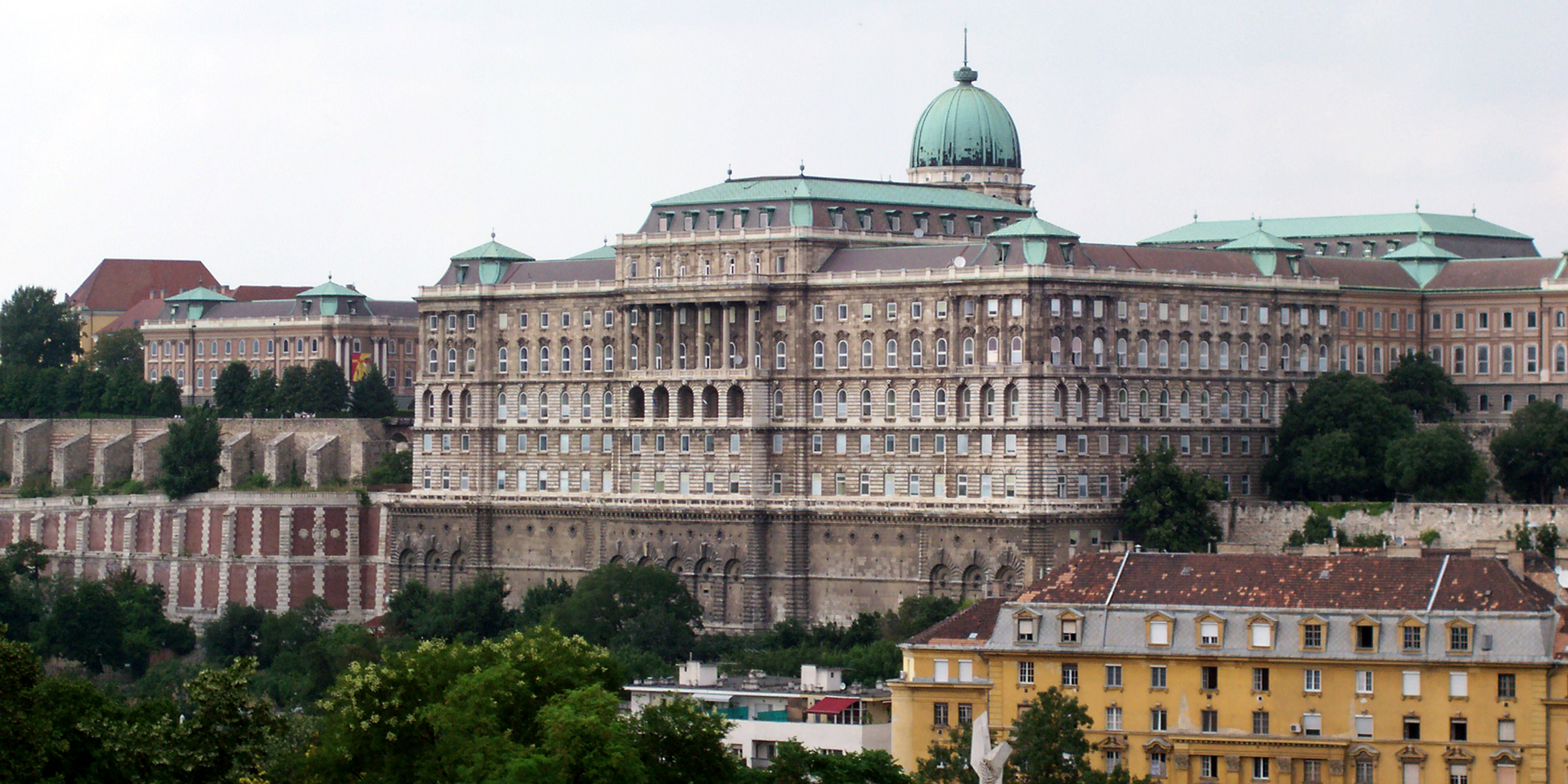
- Location: Buda Castle, Budapest, Hungary, Hungary
- Type: National library
- Established: 1802 (224 years ago)

Other information
- Website: www.oszk.hu/en

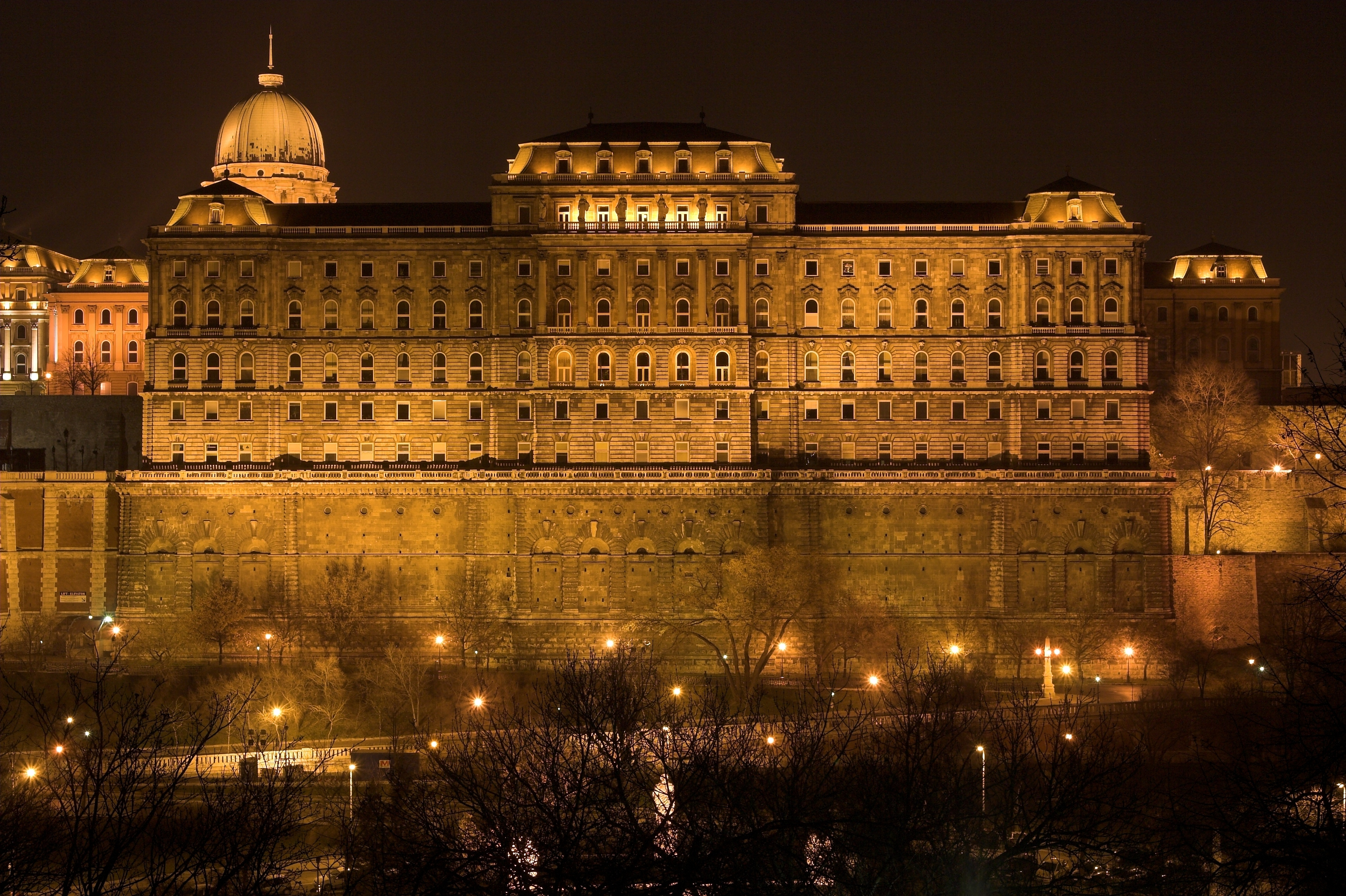
National Széchényi Library

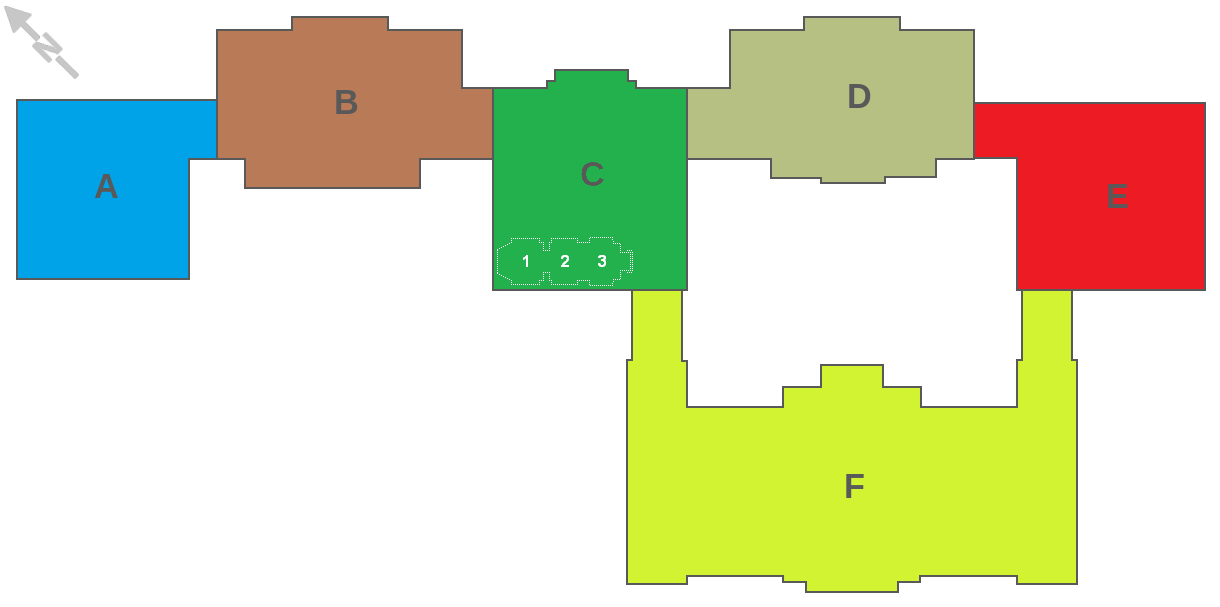
Plan of Buda Castle: buildings A, B, C, D – Hungarian National Gallery, building E – Budapest Historical Museum, building F – National Széchényi Library. Underneath building C is the Palatinal Crypt with 3 rooms.

The National Széchényi Library (Hungarian: Országos Széchényi Könyvtár, pronounced [ˈorsaːɡoʃ ˈseːt͡ʃeːɲi ˈkøɲftaːr]) (OSZK) is a library in Budapest, Hungary, located in Buda Castle. It is one of the two Hungarian national libraries, the other being University of Debrecen Library.

== History ==
The library was founded in 1802 by the highly patriotic Hungarian aristocrat Count Ferenc Széchényi. Széchényi traveled the world buying Hungarian books, which he assembled and donated to the nation. In 1803, the public library was opened in Pest. Széchényi's example resulted in a nationwide movement of book donations to the library.

In 1808, the Hungarian National Assembly ("Diet") created the Hungarian National Museum to collect the historical, archaeological and natural relics of Hungary. The Museum was merged into the Library and for the last 200 years this is how it has existed, a national depository for written, printed and objective relics of the Hungarian past.

In 1846, the Hungarian National Museum moved into its new building but it was not until 1949 that the Library became a separate entity again, with its current name. In 1985, the library moved to its new home at the Buda Castle Palace. The NSZL works on its catalogue's semantic availability.

== Directors ==
- 1803–1815: Jakab Ferdinánd Miller
- 1815–1846: István Horvát
- 1846–1875: Gábor Mátray
- 1875–1879: Vilmos Fraknói
- 1879–1893: Béla Majláth
- 1893–1894: József Szinnyei
- 1894–1919: Fejérpataky László
- 1919–1922: János Melich
- 1923: Bálint Hóman
- 1924–1929: Imre Lukinich
- 1930–1934: Emil Jakubovich
- 1934–1945: József Fitz
- 1945– 1946: József Györke
- 1946–1947: Gábor Tolnai
- 1948–1957: Béla Varjas
- 1958–1966: Magda Jóború
- 1966–1968: Géza Sebestyén
- 1968–1982: Magda Jóború
- 1982: Péter Zircz
- 1982–1984: Ferenc Molnár
- 1984–1986: Zoltán Havasi
- 1985—1993: Gyula Juhász
- 1993—1999: Géza Poprády
- 1999—2009: István Monok
- 2009—2013: Andrea Sajo (Katona)
- 2013—2014: Péter Szemerei
- 2014: János Káldos
- 2014—2019: Dr. László Tüske
- 2019—2020: Judit Hammerstien
- 2020—: Dávid Rózsa

== Collections ==
The library aims to collect "hungarica" which is describes as works published within Hungary, published in Hungarian, written by Hungarian authors, and those with Hungarian aspects. The library receives two copies of all publications and prints produced in Hungary.

=== Books ===
The library's Incunabulum Collection consists of 1,800 books printed before 1500; notable items include a fragment of the Gutenberg Bible and the Chronica Hungarorum-the first book printed in Hungary. Its Antiqua Collection holds 13,000 items from the 16th century, including a first edition of Nostradamus' The Prophecies. The Old Hungarian Library is a collection of 8,500 old Hungarian books including the Vizsoly Bible, the first complete Bible printed in Hungarian. The Apponyi Collection is a collection of over 3,000 Hungarian-related items donated by Count Albert Apponyi in 1924. One of its most notable items is the Tabula Hungariae, the earliest surviving printed map of Hungary. Other collections include the Leaflet Collection; Old Cyrillica Collection, mostly consisting of liturgical books written in Romanian Cyrillic, Early Printed Books Archive, and the History of Binding Collection.

=== Periodicals ===
With the influx of periodicals in the 19th century, József Szinnyei Sr. established the National Newspaper Library in 1884. The library has about 250,000 volumes of periodicals. Of the Hungarian and international newspaper collection, almost 75 percent of its items are the only surviving copies. Notable items include the Nova Posoniensia, the first regular newspaper in Hungary, and the Journal des Sçavans, the earliest academic journal in Europe.

Part of the collection is available in the library's digital archives. In 2026, Széchényi Library added 6.5 million pages to its Electronic Periodicals Archive (EPA).

=== Manuscripts ===
The library holds the largest manuscript collection in Hungary with about 1,400,000 total items. Notable items include the original copies of Himnusz, Hungary's national anthem, and Szózat, a Hungarian song.

=== Posters and Small Prints ===
The Collection of Posters and Small Prints, established in 1935, holds about four million documents, making it one of the biggest collections of the library.

=== Maps ===
In 1939, the Map Collection became an independent department of the National Széchényi Library. As of 2015, the map collection encompasses over 300,000 items, with 3,400 map sheets belonging to the original Széchényi-collection from the early 1800s. Approximately a quarter of the maps' coverage is of historical Hungary, and the remaining maps in the collection cover areas all over the world.

The library has been digitizing its map collection in recent years to make cultural heritage items more accessible. The library partnered with the Department of Cartography and Geoinformatics at Eötvös Loránd University to digitize some of the library's globes to create the Virtual Globes Museum. Tabula Hungariae, the first printed map of Hungary, is now digitized and accessible online.

=== Theatre History ===
In 1949, the Theatre History Collection was established to take over the libraries of the theaters that remained after World War II. It holds 30,000 plays and 380,000 documents.

=== Music ===
The library's music collection holds 170,000 items of printed sheet music. Notable items include Joseph Haydn's manuscripts and first edition works, items from Franz Liszt, and Ferenc Erkel's operas' manuscripts.

=== Photos ===
The library's photo collection was established in 2007. Among other items, it holds 40,000 glass plates or photo and film negatives of the library's book collection.

== Discovery of New Mozart Autograph ==
In 2014, a Hungarian librarian discovered four pages of Mozart's original score (autograph) of the Piano Sonata no. 11 in A Major (KV 331) in Budapest's National Széchényi Library. Until then, only the last page of the autograph survived. (Note: The original score is close to the first edition, published in 1784. However, in the first movement, in bars 5 and 6 of Variation V, the rhythm of the final eight note of the bar was altered by various editions throughout time. In the menuetto, the last quarter beat of bar 3 is a C-sharp in most editions, but in the autograph an A is printed.) The paper and handwriting of the four pages matched that of the final page of the score, held in Salzburg. Zoltán Kocsis gave the first performance of the discovered score in September 2014.

== See also ==
- Corvina Library
- Codex of Bécs
- List of libraries in Hungary
