= Gönc =

- Town
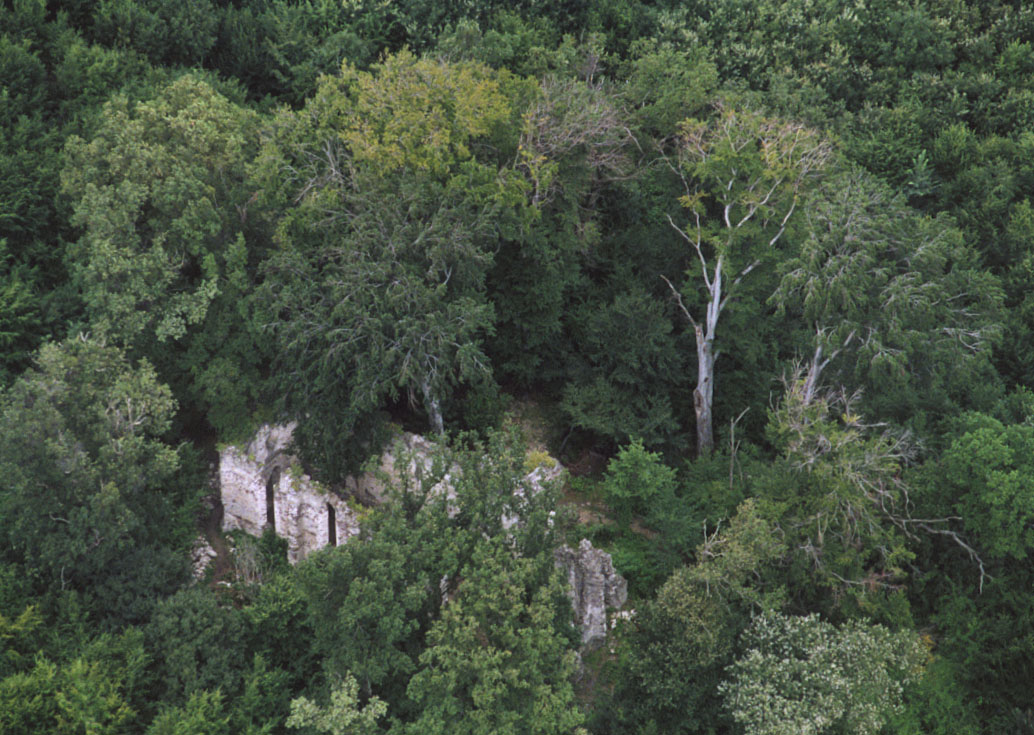
- Gönc - Pauliner Convent

- Coat of arms

- Location of Gönc
- Coordinates: 48.47099°N 21.27417°E
- Country: Hungary
- County: Borsod-Abaúj-Zemplén
- District: Gönc

Area
  - Total: 37.26 km^{2} (14.39 sq mi)

Population (2008)
  - Total: 2,097
  - Density: 56.28/km^{2} (145.8/sq mi)
- Time zone: UTC+1 (CET)
  - Summer (DST): UTC+2 (CEST)
- Postal code: 3895
- Area code: (+36) 46
- Website: www.gonc.hu

Gönc (Slovak: Gynec) is a town in Borsod-Abaúj-Zemplén county in Northern Hungary, 55 kilometers from county capital Miskolc. It is the northernmost town of Hungary and the second smallest town of the county.

== History ==
Gönc has been inhabited since the Conquest of Hungary. In the Middle Ages it was royal estate and an important market town.

Between 1570 and 1647, it was the seat of the county of Abaúj county and, as a result, it developed into an ever-growing market town. Although the lands in this region were owned by Magyar landlords, Gönc itself was a crown possession. In the 13th century the court invited German craftsmen to settle at Gönc, as was the practice in many other settlements. As a result of this, the village became more and more dominated by the new settlers.

During the age of the Reformation, Gönc became a cultural centre. It was here that Gáspár Károli, the first to translate the Bible into Hungarian in 1590, served as a minister. He is commemorated by a statue standing in front of the Calvinist church. In 1687 the Protestant college of Sárospatak temporarily moved to Gönc.

After the Treaty of Trianon Hungary lost its northern parts and Gönc became close to the new border, losing its importance in trade.

Gönc was granted town status again in 2001.
