= Tolpatch =

Hungarian foot soldiers in the 17th and 18th centuries

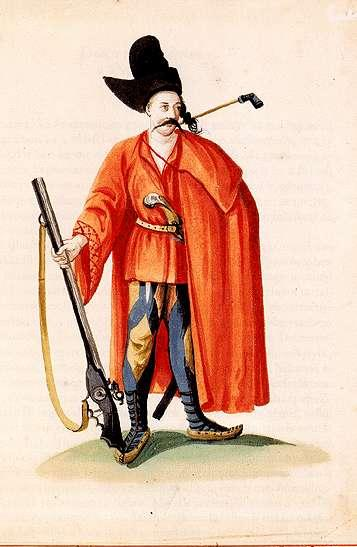
A tolpatch

The Tolpatches were Hungarian foot soldiers in the 17th and 18th centuries.

== See also ==
- Bashibazouk
