= Codex of Bécs =

Earliest Hungarian translations of the Bible

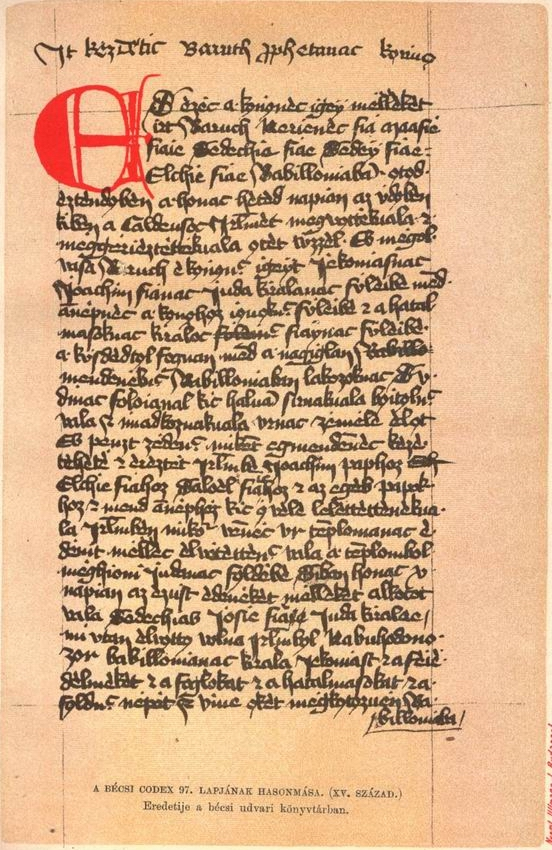
A page from the codex

Codex of Bécs (Vienna Codex) is a collection of the earliest available Hungarian translations of the Bible. It is a part of the Hussite Bible from the 15th century. A third of it is written with bastarda writing. It is located at the National Széchenyi Library, Budapest, Hungary.

== Content ==
Codex includes the translation of the following books: Ruth, Judith, Ester, Second Book of Maccabees, Baruch, Daniel and the Twelve Minor Prophets.
