= Gáspár Károlyi =

(c.1529–1592) Hungarian bible translator

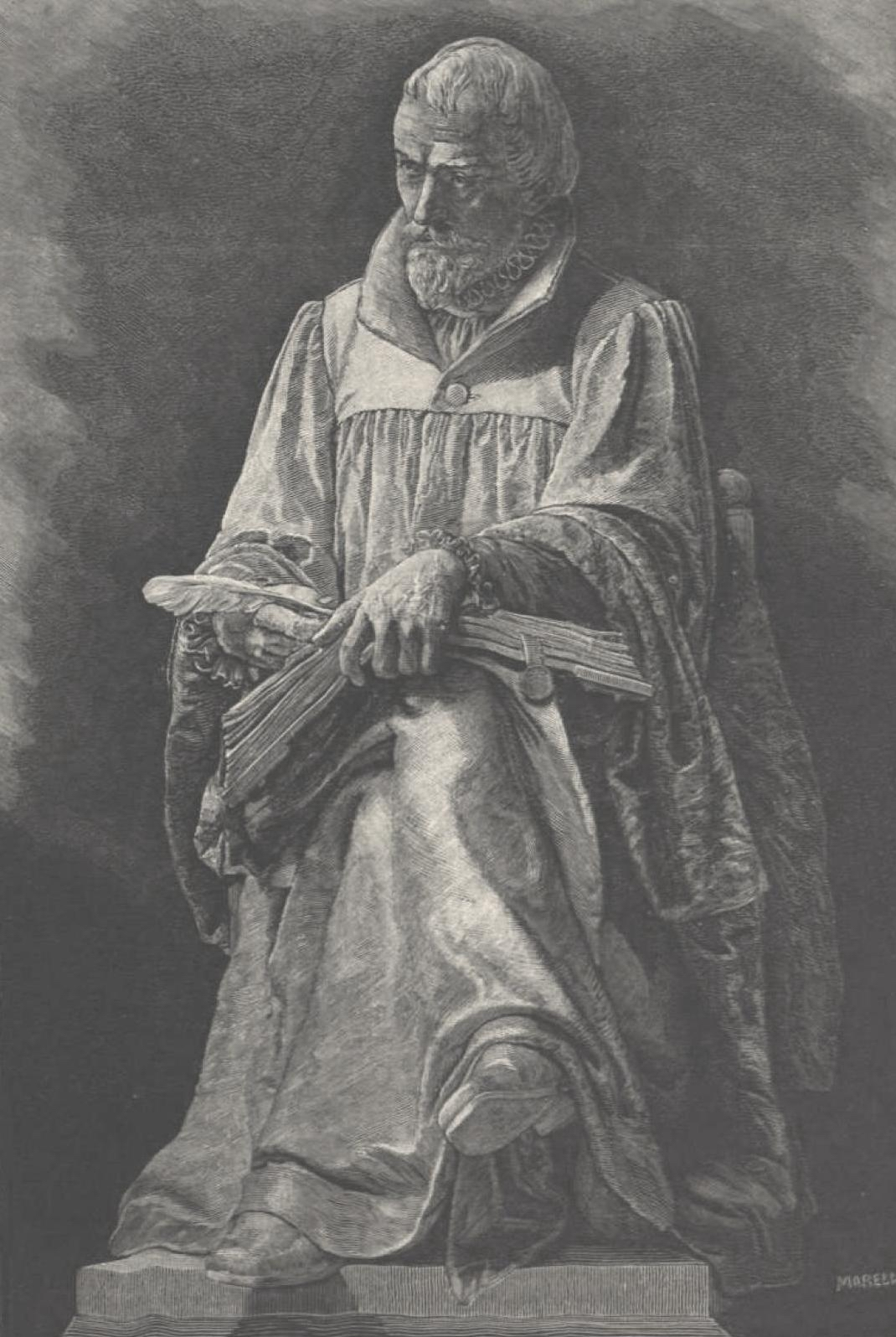
Statue of Károlyi from Gönc, photographed in 1890

Gáspár Károlyi, or in Protestant usage, Károli (c. 1529 in Nagykároly – 31 December 1591 in Gönc) was a Hungarian Calvinist pastor. He was a major figure in the Reformed Church in Hungary. He edited the Vizsoly Bible.

== Origin ==
He was born in Nagykároly (present-day Carei) c. 1530 as Gáspár Radicsics (Radičić). Károlyi was of Serbian descent and his family likely moved north from the Délvidék fleeing the dangers of the Ottoman conquest of Serbia and converted to Protestantism. He took the surname Károlyi in reference to his hometown.
