= Hungarian language =

Ugric language

Hungarian
- magyar nyelv
- Pronunciation: [ˈmɒɟɒr ˈɲɛlv]
- Native to: Hungary and areas of east Austria, Croatia, Romania, northern Serbia, Slovakia, Slovenia, western Ukraine
- Ethnicity: Hungarians
- Native speakers: 12 million (2021–2023)
- Language family: Uralic: Ugric; Hungarian
- Writing system: Latin (Hungarian alphabet); Hungarian Braille; Old Hungarian script

Official status
- Official language in: Hungary; European Union; Serbia (in Vojvodina); Slovenia (in Prekmurje)
- Recognised minority language in: Romania (in Transylvania); Croatia; Slovakia; Austria (in Burgenland); Czech Republic; Ukraine
- Regulated by: Hungarian Research Centre for Linguistics

Language codes
- ISO 639-1: hu
- ISO 639-2: hun
- ISO 639-3: hun
- Glottolog: hung1274
- Linguasphere: 41-BAA-a
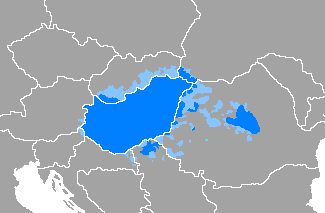
- Map of regions where those whose native language is Hungarian represent a majority (dark blue) or a substantial minority (light blue). Based on recent censuses and on the CIA World Factbook 2014.

Orsolya speaking Hungarian

Norbert speaking Hungarian

Hungarian, or Magyar (Magyar nyelv, pronounced [ˈmɒɟɒr ˈɲɛlv]), is a Ugric language of the Uralic language family spoken in Hungary and parts of several neighboring countries. It is the official language of Hungary and one of the 24 official languages of the European Union. Outside Hungary, it is also spoken by Hungarian communities in southern Slovakia, western Ukraine (Transcarpathia), central and western Romania (Transylvania), northern Serbia (Vojvodina), northern Croatia, northeastern Slovenia (Prekmurje), and eastern Austria (Burgenland).

It is also spoken by Hungarian diaspora communities worldwide, especially in North America (particularly the United States and Canada) and Israel. With 14 million speakers, it is the Uralic family's most widely spoken language.

== Classification ==
Hungarian is a member of the Uralic language family. Linguistic connections between Hungarian and other Uralic languages were noticed in the 1670s, and the family's existence was established in 1717. Hungarian is assigned to the Ugric branch along with the Mansi and Khanty languages of western Siberia (Khanty–Mansia region of North Asia). However, there is debate on whether that is a valid grouping. Historically, the language was written using the Old Hungarian script, an alphabetic writing system believed to derive from the Old Turkic script.

When the Samoyedic languages were determined to be part of the family, some linguists initially assumed that Finnic and Ugric were closer to each other than to the Samoyedic branch of the family. That is now frequently rejected.

The name of Hungary could be a result of regular sound changes of Ungrian/Ugrian, and the fact that the Eastern Slavs referred to Hungarians as Ǫgry/Ǫgrove (sg. Ǫgrinŭ) seemed to confirm that. Current literature favors the hypothesis that it comes from the name of the Turkic tribe Onoğur (which means 'ten arrows' or 'ten tribes').

Genetic studies have identified Y‑DNA haplogroups in ethnic Hungarians, such as N3a‑L708 (most common in Siberia), R1a‑Z93 (most common in Kazakhstan), and C2‑M217 (most common in Mongolia). These findings and others have been interpreted by some researchers as supporting a westward migration of ancestors from regions around present-day eastern Siberia and present-day Mongolia approximately 4,500 years ago to the Carpathian Basin.

== History ==
=== Prehistory ===
==== Academic consensus ====
The traditional view holds that Hungarian diverged from its Ugric relatives in the first half of the 1st millennium BC, to the east of the southern Urals in western Siberia. Iranian loanwords in Hungarian date around the time when the Ugric family broke up and probably span well over a millennium. They include tehén 'cow' (cf. Avestan daénu); tíz 'ten' (cf. Avestan dasa); tej 'milk' (cf. Persian dáje 'wet nurse'); and nád 'reed' (from late Middle Iranian; cf. Middle Persian nāy and Modern Persian ney).

Archaeological evidence from present-day southern Bashkortostan confirms the existence of Hungarian settlements between the Volga River and the Ural Mountains. Later the Onoğurs (and Bulgars) had a great influence on the language, especially between the 5th and 9th centuries. This layer of Turkic loans is large and varied (e.g. szó 'word', from Turkic, daru and 'crane', from the related Permic languages) including words borrowed from Oghur Turkic, e.g. borjú 'calf' (cf. Chuvash păru, părăv vs. Turkish buzağı), and dél 'noon, south' (cf. Chuvash tĕl vs. Turkish dial. düš). Many words related to agriculture, government and even family relationships show evidence of such backgrounds. Hungarian syntax and grammar were not so dramatically influenced over these three centuries.

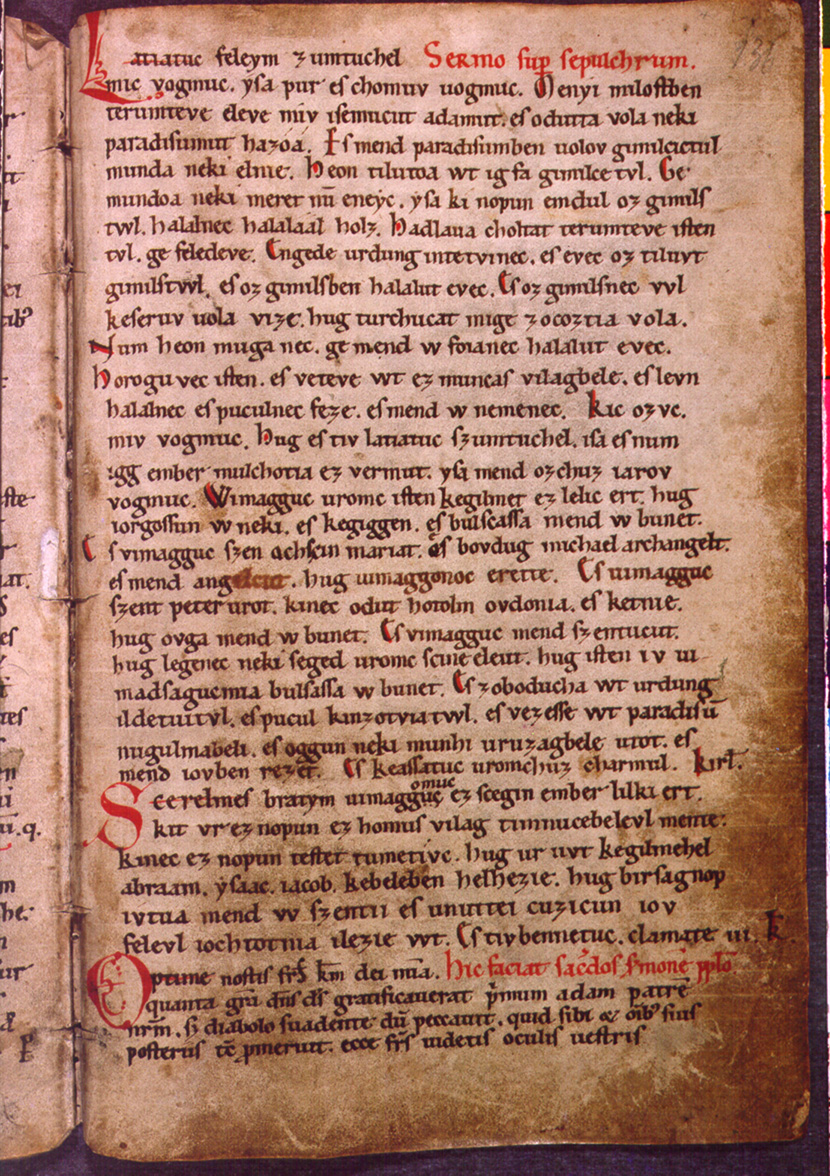
Funeral Sermon and Prayer, 12th century

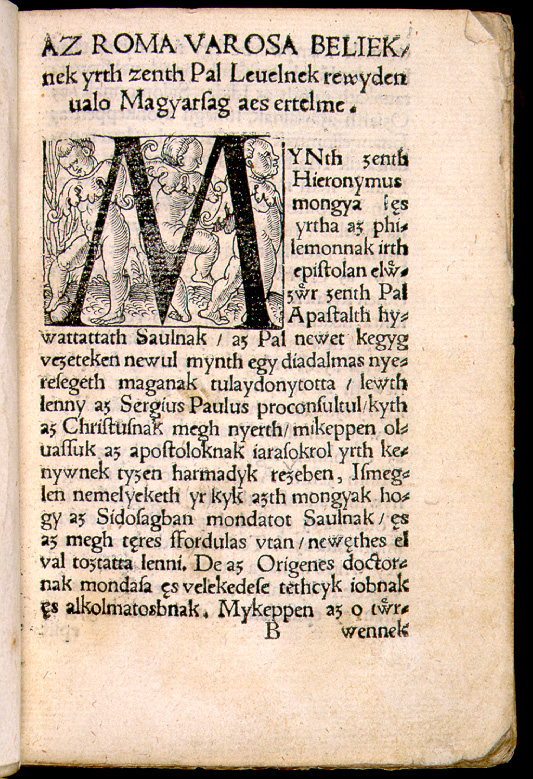
A page from the first book written completely in Hungarian, 1533

After the Hungarians arrived in the Carpathian Basin, the language came into contact with a variety of speech communities, including Slavic, Turkic, and German. Turkic loans from this period come mainly from the Pechenegs and Cumanians, who settled in Hungary during the 12th and 13th centuries, e.g. koboz "cobza" (cf. Turkish kopuz 'lute'); komondor, also known as mop dog (< *kumandur < Cuman). About 20% of Hungarian loanwords are borrowed from neighbouring Slavic languages, e.g. mák 'poppy seed', szerda 'Wednesday', csütörtök 'Thursday'... and karácsony 'Christmas'. These languages in turn borrowed words from Hungarian: e.g. Serbo-Croatian ašov from Hungarian ásó 'spade'. About 1.6 percent of the Romanian lexicon is of Hungarian origin.

In the 21st century, studies support an origin of the Uralic languages, including early Hungarian, in eastern or central Siberia, somewhere between the Ob and Yenisei rivers or near the Sayan mountains in the Russian–Mongolian border region. A 2019 study based on genetics, archaeology and linguistics, found that early Uralic speakers arrived in Europe from the east, specifically from eastern Siberia.

==== Historical controversy over origins ====
Today, the consensus among linguists is that Hungarian is a member of the Uralic family of languages. The Uralic language family is among the most firmly established and best-studied language families in the world. Nevertheless, a number of alternative views have been proposed which do not have any currency among present-day linguists.

The classification of Hungarian as a Uralic/Finno-Ugric rather than a Turkic language continued to be a matter of impassioned political controversy throughout the 18th and into the 19th centuries. During the latter half of the 19th century, a competing hypothesis proposed a Turkic affinity of Hungarian, or, alternatively, that both the Uralic and the Turkic families formed part of a superfamily of Ural–Altaic languages. Following an academic debate known as Az ugor-török háború ("the Ugric-Turkic war"), the Finno-Ugric hypothesis was concluded the sounder of the two, mainly based on work by the German linguist Josef Budenz.

Hungarians did, in fact, absorb some Turkic influences during several centuries of cohabitation. The influence on Hungarians was mainly from the Turkic Oghur speakers such as Sabirs, Bulgars of Atil, Kabars and Khazars. The Oghur tribes are often connected with the Hungarians whose exoethnonym is usually derived from Onogurs (> (H)ungars), a Turkic tribal confederation. The similarity between customs of Hungarians and the Chuvash people, the only surviving member of the Oghur tribes, is visible. For example, the Hungarians appear to have learned animal husbandry techniques from the Oghur speaking Chuvash people (or historically Suvar people), as a high proportion of words specific to agriculture and livestock are of Chuvash origin. A strong Chuvash influence was also apparent in Hungarian burial customs.

=== Old Hungarian ===
The first written accounts of Hungarian date to the 10th century, such as mostly Hungarian personal names and place names in De Administrando Imperio, written in Greek by Eastern Roman Emperor Constantine VII. No significant texts written in Old Hungarian script have survived, because the medium of writing used at the time, wood, is perishable.

The Kingdom of Hungary was founded in 1000 by Stephen I. The country became a Western-styled Christian (Roman Catholic) state, with Latin script replacing Hungarian runes. The earliest remaining fragments of the language are found in the establishing charter of the abbey of Tihany from 1055, intermingled with Latin text. The first extant text fully written in Hungarian is the Funeral Sermon and Prayer, which dates to the 1190s. Although the orthography of these early texts differed considerably from that used today, contemporary Hungarians can still understand a great deal of the reconstructed spoken language, despite changes in grammar and vocabulary.

A more extensive body of Hungarian literature arose after 1300. The earliest known example of Hungarian religious poetry is the 14th-century Lamentations of Mary. The first Bible translation was the Hussite Bible in the 1430s.

The standard language lost its diphthongs, and several postpositions transformed into suffixes, including reá "onto" (the phrase utu rea "onto the way" found in the 1055 text would later become útra). There were also changes in the system of vowel harmony. At one time, Hungarian used six verb tenses, while today only two or three are used. (Note: The future is formed with an auxiliary verb, and so is sometimes not counted as a separate tense. (See also: periphrasis.))

=== Modern Hungarian ===
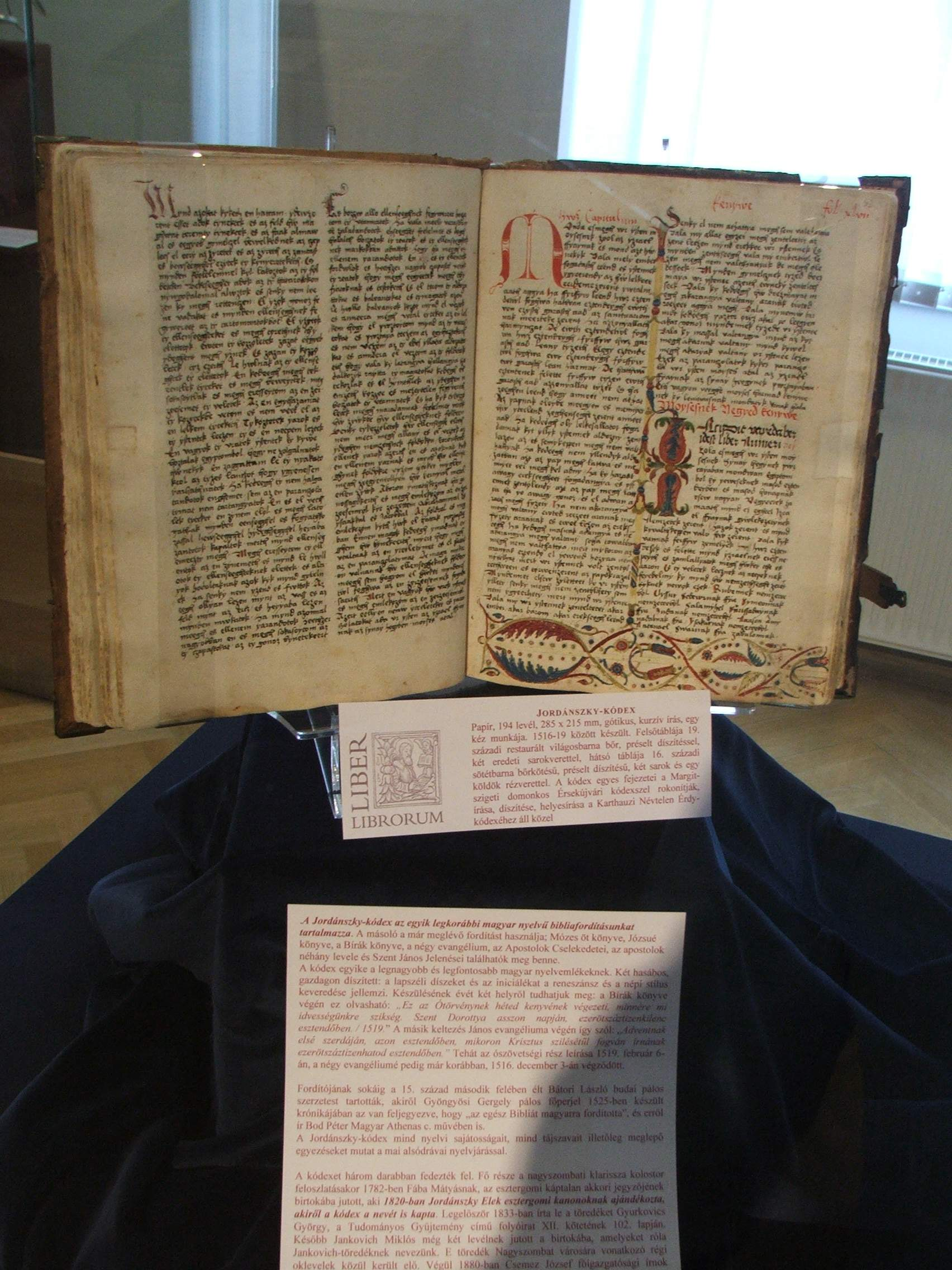
The Bible in Hungarian

In 1533, Kraków printer Benedek Komjáti published Letters of St. Paul in Hungarian (modern orthography: A Szent Pál levelei magyar nyelven), the first Hungarian-language book set in movable type.

By the 17th century, the language already closely resembled its present-day form, although two of the past tenses remained in use. German, Italian and French loans also began to appear. Further Turkish words were borrowed during the period of Ottoman rule (1541 to 1699).

In the 19th century, a group of writers, most notably Ferenc Kazinczy, spearheaded a process of nyelvújítás (language revitalization). Some words were shortened (győzedelem > győzelem, 'victory' or 'triumph'); a number of dialectal words spread nationally (e.g., cselleng 'dawdle'); extinct words were reintroduced (dísz, 'décor'); a wide range of expressions were coined using the various derivative suffixes; and some other, less frequently used methods of expanding the language were utilized. This movement produced more than ten thousand words, most of which are used actively today.

The 19th and 20th centuries saw further standardization of the language, and differences between mutually comprehensible dialects gradually diminished.

In 1920, Hungary signed the Treaty of Trianon, losing 71 percent of its territory and one-third of the ethnic Hungarian population along with it.

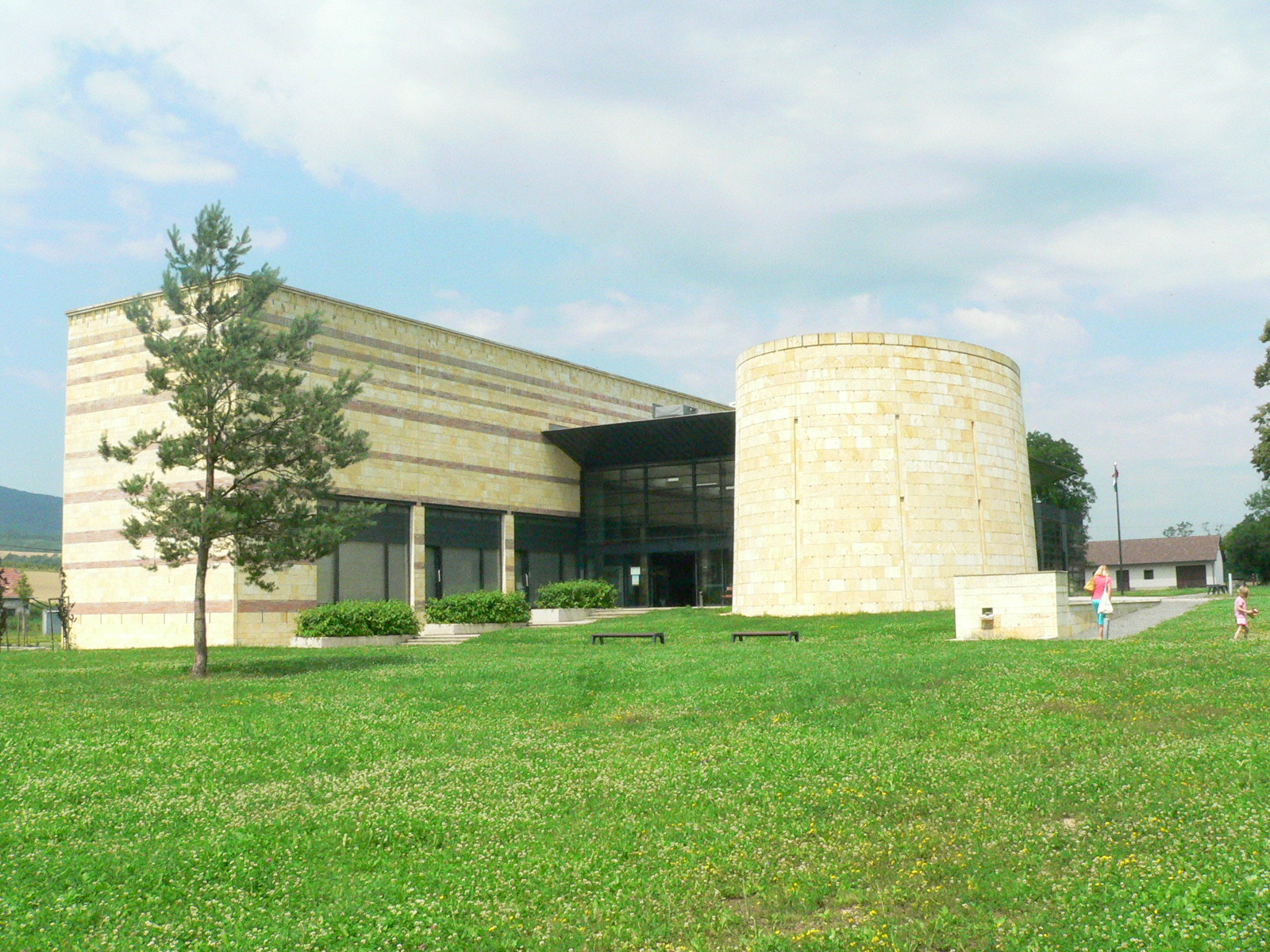
Museum of the Hungarian Language in Széphalom, Sátoraljaújhely

Today, the language holds official status nationally in Hungary and regionally in Romania, Slovakia, Serbia, Austria and Slovenia.

In 2014 the proportion of Transylvanian students studying Hungarian exceeded the proportion of Hungarian students, which shows that the effects of Romanianization are slowly getting reversed and regaining popularity. The Dictate of Trianon resulted in a high proportion of Hungarians in the surrounding 7 countries, so it is widely spoken or understood. Although host countries are not always considerate of Hungarian language users, communities are strong. The Szeklers, for example, form their own region and have their own national museum, educational institutions, and hospitals.

In the non-standard varieties of European languages there are to be found loanwords from Romani. Hungarian also has some Romani loanwords due to the large Roma population living in Hungary.

== Geographic distribution ==
Areas of Transylvania, in Romania, where Hungarian has co-official status (areas in which at least 20% of the population is Hungarian)

| Country | Speakers | Notes |
|---|---|---|
| Hungary | 9,896,333 | 2011 |
| Romania (mainly Transylvania) | 1,038,806 | 2021 |
| Slovakia | 422,065 | 2021 |
| Serbia (mainly Vojvodina) | 241,164 | 2011 |
| Germany | 217,000 | 2023 |
| Ukraine (mainly Zakarpattia) | 149,400 | 2001 |
| United States | 117,973 | 2000 |
| Canada | 75,555 | 2001 |
| Israel | 70,000 | |
| Austria (historical minorities in Burgenland) | 40,583 | 2001 |
| Australia | 17,043 | 2021 |
| Croatia | 7,218 | 2021 |
| Slovenia (mainly Prekmurje) | 9,240 | |
| Japan | 753 | 2019 |
| Total | 12–13 million | |

Source: National censuses, Ethnologue

Hungarian has about 13 million native speakers, of whom more than 9.8 million live in Hungary. According to the 2011 Hungarian census, 9,896,333 people (99.6% of the total population) speak Hungarian, of whom 9,827,875 people (98.9%) speak it as a first language, while 68,458 people (0.7%) speak it as a second language. About 2.2 million speakers live in other areas that were part of the Kingdom of Hungary before the Treaty of Trianon (1920). Of these, the largest group lives in Transylvania, the western half of present-day Romania, where there are approximately 1.25 million Hungarians. There are large Hungarian communities also in Slovakia, Serbia and Ukraine, and Hungarians can also be found in Austria, Croatia, and Slovenia, as well as about a million additional people scattered in other parts of the world. For example, there are more than one hundred thousand Hungarian speakers in the Hungarian American community and 1.5 million with Hungarian ancestry in the United States.

=== Official status ===
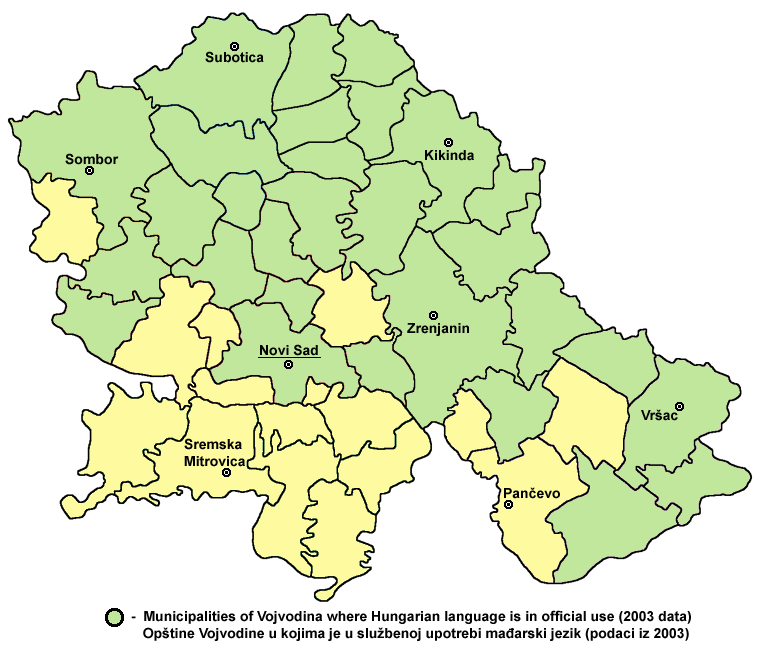
Official usage of Hungarian language in Vojvodina, Serbia

Hungarian is the official language of Hungary, and thus an official language of the European Union. Hungarian is also one of the official languages of Serbian province of Vojvodina and an official language of three municipalities in Slovenia: Hodoš, Dobrovnik and Lendava, along with Slovene. Hungarian is officially recognized as a minority or regional language in Austria, Croatia, Romania, Zakarpattia in Ukraine, and Slovakia. In Romania it is a recognized minority language used at local level in communes, towns and municipalities with an ethnic Hungarian population of over 20%.

=== Dialects ===
The dialects of Hungarian identified by Ethnologue are: Alföld, West Danube, Danube-Tisza, King's Pass Hungarian, Northeast Hungarian, Northwest Hungarian, Székely and West Hungarian. These dialects are, for the most part, mutually intelligible. The Hungarian Csángó dialect, which is mentioned but not listed separately by Ethnologue, is spoken primarily in Bacău County in eastern Romania. The Csángó Hungarian group has been largely isolated from other Hungarian people, and therefore preserved features that closely resemble earlier forms of Hungarian.

== Phonology ==
Hungarian vowels

Hungarian has 14 vowel phonemes and 30 consonant phonemes (or 31, depending on the dialect). The vowel phonemes can be grouped as pairs of short and long vowels such as o and ó. Most of the pairs have an almost similar pronunciation and vary significantly only in their duration. However, pairs a/á and e/é differ both in closedness and in length.

Consonant phonemes of Hungarian
| | | Labial | Dental | Post- alveolar | Palatal | Velar | Glottal |
|---|---|---|---|---|---|---|---|
| Nasal | | m | n̪ | | ɲ | (ŋ) | |
| Plosive | voiceless | p | t | | c^{*} | k | |
| Plosive | voiced | b | d | | ɟ^{*} | ɡ | |
| Affricate | voiceless | | t͡s | t͡ʃ | (c͡ç)^{*} | | |
| Affricate | voiced | | d͡z | d͡ʒ | (ɟ͡ʝ)^{*} | | |
| Fricative | voiceless | f | s̪ | ʃ | (ç) | (x) | h |
| Fricative | voiced | v | z̪ | ʒ | (ʝ) | | (ɦ) |
| Trill | | | r̪ | | | | |
| Approximant | median | | | | j | | |
| Approximant | lateral | | l̪ | | (ʎ) | | |

- ^* It is debated whether the palatal consonant pair consists of stops or affricates. They are considered affricates or stops, depending on register, by Tamás Szende, head of the department of General Linguistics at PPKE, and stops by Mária Gósy, research professor, head of the Department of Phonetics at ELTE. The reason for the different analyses is that the relative duration of the friction of /c/ (as compared to the duration of its closure) is longer than those of the stops, but shorter than those of the affricates. /c/ has the stop-like nature of having a full duration no longer than those of other (voiceless) stops such as /p, t, k/ but, considering the average closure time in relation to the friction time of the consonants, its duration structure is somewhat closer to those of the affricates.

Consonant length is also distinctive in Hungarian. Most consonant phonemes can occur as geminates.

The voiced palatal plosive /ɟ/, written ⟨gy⟩, occurs in the name of the country, "Magyarország" (Hungary), pronounced /ˈmɒɟɒrorsaːɡ/. It is one of four palatal consonants, the others being ⟨ty⟩, ⟨ny⟩, and ⟨j⟩. Historically, and mostly in some northern dialects (for example, the modern Palóc dialect), a fifth palatalized consonant, /ʎ/, existed, written ⟨ly⟩. Elsewhere, this phoneme has merged with /j/.

[ç] and [ʝ] are only found at the end of words in the second-person singular subjunctive/imperative after a voiceless/voiced consonant, both written "j", as in "kapj" (get!) or "varrj" (sew!), as an allophone of /j/.

/x/ is also rare, and it is mostly an allophone of /h/. It is spelled as ⟨h⟩, and is from German loanwords, like the name Bach. A similar consonant is /ɦ/. This is also spelled as ⟨h⟩ and is also found in German loanwords, like achát (agate).

/ŋ/ is an uncommon consonant, written ⟨ng⟩. It mostly appears in loanwords from English such as "tréning" or "brending", and in native words like "ring" (to swing). ⟨ng⟩ is a digraph; however unlike other digraphs, it is not a letter of the Hungarian alphabet.

⟨r⟩ is pronounced as an alveolar tap (akkora 'of that size'), while ⟨rr⟩ is pronounced as an alveolar trill (akkorra 'by that time'), like in Spanish and Italian.

=== Prosody ===
Primary stress is always on the first syllable of the word, as in Finnish and the neighbouring Slovak and Czech. There is a secondary stress on other syllables in compounds: viszontlátásra ("goodbye") is pronounced /ˈvisontˌlaːtaːʃrɒ/.

== Grammar ==
Hungarian is an agglutinative language. It uses various affixes, mainly suffixes but also some prefixes and a circumfix, to change a word's meaning and its grammatical function.

=== Vowel harmony ===
Hungarian uses vowel harmony to attach suffixes to words. That means that most suffixes have two or three different forms, and the choice between them depends on the vowels of the head word. There are some minor and unpredictable exceptions to the rule.

=== Nouns ===
Nouns have 18 cases, which are formed regularly with suffixes. The nominative case is unmarked (az alma 'the apple') and, for example, the accusative is marked with the suffix –t (az almát '[I eat] the apple'). Half of the cases express a combination of the source-location-target and surface-inside-proximity ternary distinctions (three times three cases); there is a separate case ending –ból / –ből meaning a combination of source and insideness: 'from inside of'.

Possession is expressed by a possessive suffix on the possessed object, rather than the possessor as in English (Peter's apple becomes Péter almája, literally 'Peter apple-his'). Noun plurals are formed with –k (az almák 'the apples'), but after a numeral, the singular is used (két alma 'two apples', literally 'two apple'; not *két almák).

Unlike English, Hungarian uses case suffixes and nearly always postpositions instead of prepositions.

There are two types of articles in Hungarian, definite and indefinite, which roughly correspond to the equivalents in English.

Hungarian nouns (and pronouns) are not gendered: there is only one class of nouns (and pronouns).

=== Adjectives ===
Adjectives precede nouns (a piros alma 'the red apple') and have three degrees: positive (piros 'red'), comparative (pirosabb 'redder') and superlative (a legpirosabb 'the reddest').

If the noun takes the plural or a case, an attributive adjective is invariable: a piros almák 'the red apples'. However, a predicative adjective agrees with the noun: az almák pirosak 'the apples are red'. Adjectives by themselves can behave as nouns (and so can take case suffixes): Melyik almát kéred? – A pirosat. 'Which apple would you like? – The red one'.

=== Word order ===
Hungarian subject–object–verb word order is free, although the meaning slightly changes. Almost all permutations of the following sample are valid, but with stress on different parts of the meaning. However, Hungarian is a topic-prominent language, and so has a word order that depends not only on syntax but also on the topic–comment structure of the sentence (for example, what aspect is assumed to be known and what is emphasized).

A Hungarian sentence generally has the following order: topic, comment (or focus), verb and the rest.

The topic shows that the proposition is only for that particular thing or aspect, and it implies that the proposition is not true for some others. For example, in "Az almát János látja". ('It is John who sees the apple'. Literally 'The apple John sees.'), the apple is in the topic, implying that other objects may be seen by not him but other people (the pear may be seen by Peter). The topic part may be empty.

The focus shows the new information for the listeners that may not have been known or that their knowledge must be corrected. For example, "Én vagyok az apád". ('I am your father'. Literally, 'It is I who am your father'.), from the movie The Empire Strikes Back, the pronoun I (én) is in the focus and implies that it is new information, and the listener thought that someone else is his father.

Although Hungarian is sometimes described as having free word order, different word orders are generally not interchangeable, and the neutral order is not always correct to use. The intonation is also different with different topic-comment structures. The topic usually has a rising intonation, the focus having a falling intonation. In the following examples, the topic is marked with italics, and the focus (comment) is marked with boldface.

- János látja az almát. - 'John sees the apple'. Neutral sentence.
- János **látja** az almát. - 'John **sees** the apple'. (Peter may not see the apple.)
- **János** látja az almát. - 'It is John who sees the apple'. (The listener may have thought that it is Peter.)
- **Látja** János az almát. - 'John does see the apple'. (The listener may have thought that John does not see the apple.)
- János **az almát** látja. - 'What John sees is the apple'. (It is the apple, not the pear, that John specifically sees. However, Peter may see the pear.)
- Az almát **látja** János. - 'It is the apple that is seen by John'. (The pear may not be seen by John, but it may be smelled, for example.)
- Az almát **János** látja. - 'It is by John that the apple is seen'. (It is not seen by Peter, but the pear may be seen by Peter, for example.)

== Politeness ==
Hungarian has a four-tiered system for expressing levels of politeness. From highest to lowest:

- Ön (önözés): Use of this form in speech shows respect towards the person addressed, but it is also the common way of speaking in official texts and business communications. Here "you", the second person, is grammatically addressed in the third person.
- Maga (magázás, magázódás): Use of this form serves to show that the speakers wish to distance themselves from the person they address. A boss could also address a subordinate as maga. Aside from the different pronoun it is grammatically the same as "önözés".
- Néni/bácsi (tetszikezés): This is a somewhat affectionate way of expressing politeness and is grammatically the same as "önözés" or "magázódás", but adds a certain verb in auxiliary role "tetszik" ("like") to support the main verb of the sentence. For example, children are supposed to address adults who are not parents, close friends or close relatives by using "tetszik" ("you like"): "Hogy vagy?" ("How are you?") here becomes "Hogy tetszik lenni?" ("How do you like to be?"). The elderly, especially women, are generally addressed this way, even by adults.
- Te (tegezés, tegeződés or pertu, per tu from Latin): Used generally, i.e. with persons with whom none of the above forms of politeness is required, and, in religious contexts, to address God. The highest rank, the king, was traditionally addressed "per tu" by all, peasants and noblemen alike, though with Hungary not having had any crowned king since 1918, this practice survives only in folk tales and children's stories. Use of "tegezés" in the media and advertisements has become more frequent since the early 1990s. It is informal and is normally used in families, among friends, colleagues, among young people, and by adults speaking to children; it can be compared to addressing somebody by their first name in English. Perhaps prompted by the widespread use of English (a language without T–V distinction in most contemporary dialects) on the Internet, "tegezés" is also becoming the standard way to address people over the Internet, regardless of politeness.

The four-tiered system has somewhat been eroded due to the recent expansion of "tegeződés" and "önözés".

Some anomalies emerged with the arrival of multinational companies who have addressed their customers in the te (least polite) form right from the beginning of their presence in Hungary. A typical example is the Swedish furniture shop IKEA, whose web site and other publications address the customers in te form. When a news site asked IKEA—using the te form—why they address their customers this way, IKEA's PR Manager explained in his answer—using the ön form—that their way of communication reflects IKEA's open-mindedness and the Swedish culture. However IKEA in France uses the polite (vous) form. Another example is the communication of Yettel Hungary (earlier Telenor, a mobile network operator) towards its customers. Yettel chose to communicate towards business customers in the polite ön form while all other customers are addressed in the less polite te form.

== Vocabulary ==
Examples with ad
| Hungarian | English |
|---|---|
| ad | gives |
Derived terms with suffixes
| adni | to give |
| adás | transmission, broadcast |
| adó | tax or transmitter |
| adózik | pays tax |
| adózó | taxpayer |
| adós | debtor |
| adósság | debt |
| adat | data |
| adakozik | gives (practise charity) |
| adalék | additive (ingredient) |
| adag | dose, portion |
| adomány | donation |
| adoma | anecdote |
With verbal prefixes
| átad | hands over |
| bead | hands in |
| elad | sells |
| felad | gives up, mails |
| hozzáad | augments, adds to |
| kiad | rents out, publishes, extradites |
| lead | loses weight, deposits (an object) |
| megad | repays (debt), calls (poker), grants (permission) |
| összead | adds (does mathematical addition) |

During the first early phase of Hungarian language reforms (late 18th and early 19th centuries) more than ten thousand words were coined, several thousand of which are still actively used today (see also Ferenc Kazinczy, the leading figure of the Hungarian language reforms.) Kazinczy's chief goal was to replace existing words of German and Latin origins with newly created Hungarian words. As a result, Kazinczy and his later followers (the reformers) significantly reduced the formerly high ratio of words of Latin and German origins in the Hungarian language, which were related to social sciences, natural sciences, politics and economics, institutional names, fashion etc. Giving an accurate estimate for the total word count is difficult, since it is hard to define a "word" in agglutinating languages, due to the existence of affixed words and compound words. To obtain a meaningful definition of compound words, it is necessary to exclude compounds whose meaning is the mere sum of its elements. The largest dictionaries giving translations from Hungarian to another language contain 120,000 words and phrases (but this may include redundant phrases as well, because of translation issues). The new desk lexicon of the Hungarian language contains 75,000 words, and the Comprehensive Dictionary of Hungarian Language (to be published in 18 volumes in the next twenty years) is planned to contain 110,000 words. The default Hungarian lexicon is usually estimated to comprise 60,000 to 100,000 words. (Independently of specific languages, speakers actively use at most 10,000 to 20,000 words, with an average intellectual using 25,000 to 30,000 words.) However, all the Hungarian lexemes collected from technical texts, dialects etc. would total up to 1,000,000 words.

Parts of the lexicon can be organized using word-bushes (see an example on the right). The words in these bushes share a common root, are related through inflection, derivation and compounding, and are usually broadly related in meaning.

The basic vocabulary shares several hundred word roots with other Uralic languages like Finnish, Estonian, Mansi and Khanty. Examples are the verb él "live" (Finnish elää), the numbers kettő (2), három (3), négy (4) (cf. Mansi китыг kitig, хурум khurum, нила nila, Finnish kaksi, kolme, neljä, Estonian kaks, kolm, neli), as well as víz 'water', kéz 'hand', vér 'blood', fej 'head' (cf. Finnish and Estonian vesi, käsi, veri, Finnish pää, Estonian pea or pää).

Words for elementary kinship and nature are more Ugric, less r-Turkic and less Slavic. Words related to agriculture are about 50% r-Turkic and 50% Slavic; pastoral terms are more r-Turkic, less Ugric and less Slavic. Finally, Christian and state terminology is more Slavic and less r-Turkic. The Slavic is most probably proto-Slovak or proto-Slovene. This is easily understood in the Uralic paradigm, proto-Magyars were first similar to Ob-Ugors, who were mainly hunters, fishers and gatherers, but with some horses too. Then they accultured to Bulgarian r-Turks, so the older layer of agriculture words (wine, beer, wheat, barley etc.) are purely r-Turkic, and many terms of statesmanship and religion were, too.

Except for a few Latin and Greek loanwords, these differences are unnoticed even by native speakers; the words have been entirely adopted into the Hungarian lexicon. There are an increasing number of English loanwords, especially in technical fields and slang as well.

Proportion of loanwords in modern Hungarian
| Uncertain | 30% |
| Finno-Ugric | 21% |
| Slavic | 20% |
| German | 11% |
| Turkic | 9.5% |
| Latin and Greek | 6% |
| Romance | 2.5% |
| Other known | 1% |

Calculating the percentile fractions of the origins of various words within a language is an essentially meaningless and impossible exercise. There is no definite set number of words within a language that can be tallied up, and other factors like the frequency of use and dialectal differences also affect the result. An approximate estimate of the number of foreign loanwords in Hungarian can be established, as well as the general frequency of their usage.

According to estimates, the most numerous loanwords come from Slavic languages (1252 words of proven Slavic origin, around 484 universally used in all dialects of Hungarian, 694 in specific dialects only, and 74 obsolete words). An additional 382 words are classified as "possibly Slavic", 147 of them present in all dialects, 209 present in certain dialects, and 26 no longer in common use, bringing the final number of potentially Slavic loanwords in all dialects to 631, and the total number of potentially Slavic loanwords across all dialects to about 1634.

The second largest group of loanwords are made up of Turkic loanwords, which can be divided into pre-Conquest, and Ottoman layers, with the pre-Conquest words making up the absolute majority of them. Due to centuries of cohabitation with Turkic peoples such as the Volga Bulgars and Khazars, the exact origin of certain words can be hard to pin down. The number of Turkic loanwords can be difficult to enumerate from the pre-Conquest period due to a lack of written sources from R-Turkic languages from the period, and even later, but generally the number of Turkic loanwords are estimated to be between 300 and 500.

The third largest group is made up of German loanwords, which number around 400. These started appearing in the language as early as the 11th century, but became especially prominent during the Habsburg-era, starting in the 16th century.

A much smaller but also much older layer of loanwords are Iranian loanwords, which only number in the dozens but serve as an important layer of the vocabulary. These words include tehén 'cow', tej 'milk', asszony 'married woman, wife', vám 'tax', vár 'fortress', vásár 'market', üveg 'glass' etc.

Other, mostly more technical, religious, or scholarly loanwords also numbering in the dozens are from Latin and Greek, while newer layers may include virtually any European language that Hungarian has been in contact with over the centuries.

=== Word formation ===
Words can be compounds or derived. Most derivation is with suffixes, but there is a small set of derivational prefixes as well.

==== Compounds ====
Compounds have been present in the language since the Proto-Uralic era. Numerous ancient compounds transformed to base words during the centuries. Today, compounds play an important role in vocabulary.

A good example is the word arc:

orr (nose) + száj (mouth) → orca (face) (colloquial until the end of the 19th century and still in use in some dialects) > arc (face)

Compounds are made up of two base words: the first is the prefix, the latter is the suffix. A compound can be subordinative: the prefix is in logical connection with the suffix. If the prefix is the subject of the suffix, the compound is generally classified as a subjective one. There are objective, determinative, and adjunctive compounds as well. Some examples are given below:

Subjective:

menny (heaven) + dörgés (rumbling) → mennydörgés (thundering)
Nap (Sun) + sütötte (lit by) → napsütötte (sunlit)

Objective:

fa (tree, wood) + vágó (cutter) → favágó (lumberjack, literally "woodcutter")

Determinative:

új (new) + já (modification of -vá, -vé a suffix meaning "making it to something") + építés (construction) → újjáépítés (reconstruction, literally "making something to be new by construction")

Adjunctive:

sárga (yellow) + réz (copper) → sárgaréz (brass)

According to current orthographic rules, a subordinative compound word has to be written as a single word, without spaces; however, if a compound of three or more words (not counting one-syllable verbal prefixes) is seven or more syllables long (not counting case suffixes), a hyphen must be inserted at the appropriate boundary to ease the determination of word boundaries for the reader.

Other compound words are coordinatives: there is no concrete relation between the prefix and the suffix. Subcategories include reduplication (to emphasise the meaning; olykor-olykor 'really occasionally'), twin words (where a base word and a distorted form of it makes up a compound: gizgaz, where the suffix 'gaz' means 'weed' and the prefix giz is the distorted form; the compound itself means 'inconsiderable weed'), and such compounds which have meanings, but neither their prefixes, nor their suffixes make sense (for example, hercehurca 'complex, obsolete procedures').

A compound also can be made up by multiple (i.e., more than two) base words: in this case, at least one word element, or even both the prefix and the suffix, is a compound. Some examples:

elme [mind; standalone base] + (gyógy [medical] + intézet [institute]) → elmegyógyintézet (asylum)
(hadi [militarian] + fogoly [prisoner]) + (munka [work] + tábor [camp]) → hadifogoly-munkatábor (work camp of prisoners of war)

=== Noteworthy lexical items ===
==== Points of the compass ====
Hungarian words for the points of the compass are directly derived from the position of the Sun during the day in the Northern Hemisphere.

- North = észak (from "éj(szaka)", 'night'), as the Sun never shines from the north
- South = dél ('noon'), as the Sun shines from the south at noon
- East = kelet (from "nap(kelte)", literally: 'rising of the Sun, waking up of the Sun'), as the Sun rises in the east
- West = nyugat (from "nap(nyugta)", literally: 'setting of the Sun, calming of the Sun'), as the Sun sets in the west

==== Two words for "red" ====
There are two basic words for "red" in Hungarian: "piros" and "vörös" (variant: "veres"; compare with Estonian "verev" or Finnish "punainen"). The word "vörös" is related to "vér", meaning "blood" (Finnish and Estonian "veri"). When they refer to an actual difference in colour (as on a colour chart), "vörös" usually refers to the deeper (darker or more red and less orange) hue of red. While many languages have multiple names for this colour, often Hungarian scholars assume that this is unique in recognizing two shades of red as separate and distinct "folk colours".

However, the two words are also used independently of the above in collocations. "Piros" is learned by children first, as it is generally used to describe inanimate, artificial things, or things seen as cheerful or neutral, while "vörös" typically refers to animate or natural things (biological, geological, physical and astronomical objects), as well as serious or emotionally charged subjects.

When the rules outlined above are in contradiction, typical collocations usually prevail. In some cases where a typical collocation does not exist, the use of either of the two words may be equally adequate.

Examples:

- Expressions where "red" typically translates to "piros": a red road sign, red traffic lights, the red line of Budapest Metro, red (now called express) bus lines in Budapest, a holiday shown in red in the calendar, ruddy complexion, the red nose of a clown, some red flowers (those of a neutral nature, e.g. tulips), red peppers and paprika, red card suits (hearts and diamonds), red stripes, circles, and some features on a flag (but the red flag and its variants translate to "vörös"), etc.
- Expressions where "red" typically translates to "vörös": a red railway signal (unlike traffic lights, see above), Red Sea, Red Square, Red Army, Red Baron, Erik the Red, red wine, red carpet (for receiving important guests), red curtains (for theaters), red velvet, red hair or beard, red lion (the mythical animal), the Red Cross, the novel The Red and the Black, redshift, red giant, red blood cells, red oak, some red flowers (those with passionate connotations, e.g. roses), red fox, names of ferric and other red minerals, red copper, rust, red phosphorus, rubies, the colour of blushing with anger or shame, the red nose of an alcoholic (in contrast with that of a clown, see above), the red posterior of a baboon, red meat, regular onion (not the red onion, which is "lila"), litmus paper (in acid), cities, countries, or other political entities associated with leftist movements (e.g. Red Vienna, Red Russia), etc.

==== Kinship terms ====
The Hungarian words for brothers and sisters are differentiated based upon relative age. There is also a general word for "sibling": testvér, from test "body" and vér "blood"; i.e., originating from the same body and blood.

| | younger | elder | unspecified relative age |
|---|---|---|---|
| brother | öcs | báty | fivér or fiútestvér |
| sister | húg | nővér néne (archaic) | nővér or lánytestvér |
| sibling | kistestvér | (nagytestvér) | testvér |

(There used to be a separate word for "elder sister", néne, but it has become obsolete [except to mean "aunt" in some dialects] and has been replaced by the generic word for "sister".)

In addition, there are separate prefixes for several ancestors and descendants:

| parent | grandparent | great- grandparent | great-great- grandparent | great-great-great- grandparent | great-great-great-great- grandparent |
|---|---|---|---|---|---|
| szülő | nagyszülő | déd(nagy)szülő | ük(nagy)szülő | szép(nagy)szülő (OR ük-ük(nagy)szülő) | ó(nagy)szülő (OR ük-ük-ük(nagy)szülő) |
| child | grandchild | great- grandchild | great-great- grandchild | great-great-great- grandchild | great-great-great-great- grandchild |
| gyerek | unoka | dédunoka | ükunoka | szépunoka (OR ük-ükunoka) | óunoka (OR ük-ük-ükunoka) |

The words for "boy" and "girl" are applied with possessive suffixes. Nevertheless, the terms are differentiated with different declension or lexemes:

| | boy/girl | (his/her) son/daughter | (his/her) lover, partner |
|---|---|---|---|
| male | fiú | fia | fiúja/barátja |
| female | lány | lánya | barátnője |

Fia is only used in this, irregular possessive form; it has no nominative on its own (see inalienable possession). However, the word fiú can also take the regular suffix, in which case the resulting word (fiúja) will refer to a lover or partner (boyfriend), rather than a male offspring.

The word fiú (boy) is also often noted as an extreme example of the ability of the language to add suffixes to a word, by forming fiaiéi, adding vowel-form suffixes only, where the result is quite a frequently used word:

| fiú | boy |
| fia | his/her son |
| fiai | his/her sons |
| fiáé | his/her son's (singular object) |
| fiáéi | his/her son's (plural object) |
| fiaié | his/her sons' (singular object) |
| fiaiéi | his/her sons' (plural object) |

==== Extremely long words ====
- megszentségteleníthetetlenségeskedéseitekért

Partition to root and suffixes with explanations:

| meg- | verb prefix; in this case, it means "completed" |
| szent | holy (the word root) |
| -ség | like English "-ness", as in "holiness" |
| -t(e)len | variant of "-tlen", noun suffix expressing the lack of something; like English "-less", as in "useless" |
| -ít | constitutes a transitive verb from an adjective |
| -het | expresses possibility; somewhat similar to the English modal verbs "may" or "can" |
| -(e)tlen | another variant of "-tlen" |
| -ség | (see above) |
| -es | constitutes an adjective from a noun; like English "-y" as in "witty" |
| -ked | attached to an adjective (e.g. "strong"), produces the verb "to pretend to be (strong)" |
| -és | constitutes a noun from a verb; there are various ways this is done in English, e.g. "-ance" in "acceptance" |
| -eitek | plural possessive suffix, second-person plural (e.g. "apple" → "your apples", where "your" refers to multiple people) |
| -ért | approximately translates to "because of", or in this case simply "for" |

Translation: "for your [plural] repeated pretending to be indesecratable"

The above word is often considered to be the longest word in Hungarian, although there are longer words like:

- legeslegmegszentségteleníttethetetlenebbjeitekként

leges-leg-meg-szent-ség-telen-ít-tet-het-etlen-ebb-je-i-tek-ként
"like those of you that are the very least possible to get desecrated"

Words of such length are not used in practice and are difficult to understand even for natives. They were invented to show, in a somewhat facetious way, the ability of the language to form long words (see agglutinative language). They are not compound words but are formed by adding a series of one- and two-syllable suffixes (and a few prefixes) to a simple root ("szent", saint or holy). There is virtually no limit for the length of words, but when too many suffixes are added, the meaning of the word becomes less clear, and the word becomes hard to understand and will work like a riddle even for native speakers.

==== Hungarian words in English ====
The English word best known as being of Hungarian origin is probably paprika, from Serbo-Croatian papar "pepper" and the Hungarian diminutive -ka. The most common, however, is coach, from kocsi, originally kocsi szekér "car from/in the style of Kocs". Others are:

- shako, from csákó, from csákósüveg "peaked cap"
- sabre, from szablya
- heyduck, from hajdúk, plural of hajdú "brigand"
- tolpatch, from talpas "foot-soldier", apparently derived from talp "sole".

== Writing system ==
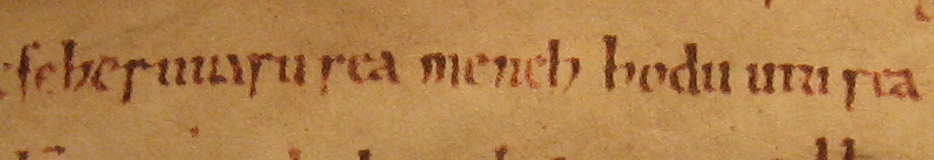
The oldest surviving words written in Hungarian, from the founding declaration of the Benedictine Abbey of Tihany, 1055. It reads "feheruuaru rea meneh hodu utu rea" (in modern Hungarian "Fehérvárra menő hadi útra", meaning "to the military road going to Fehérvár").

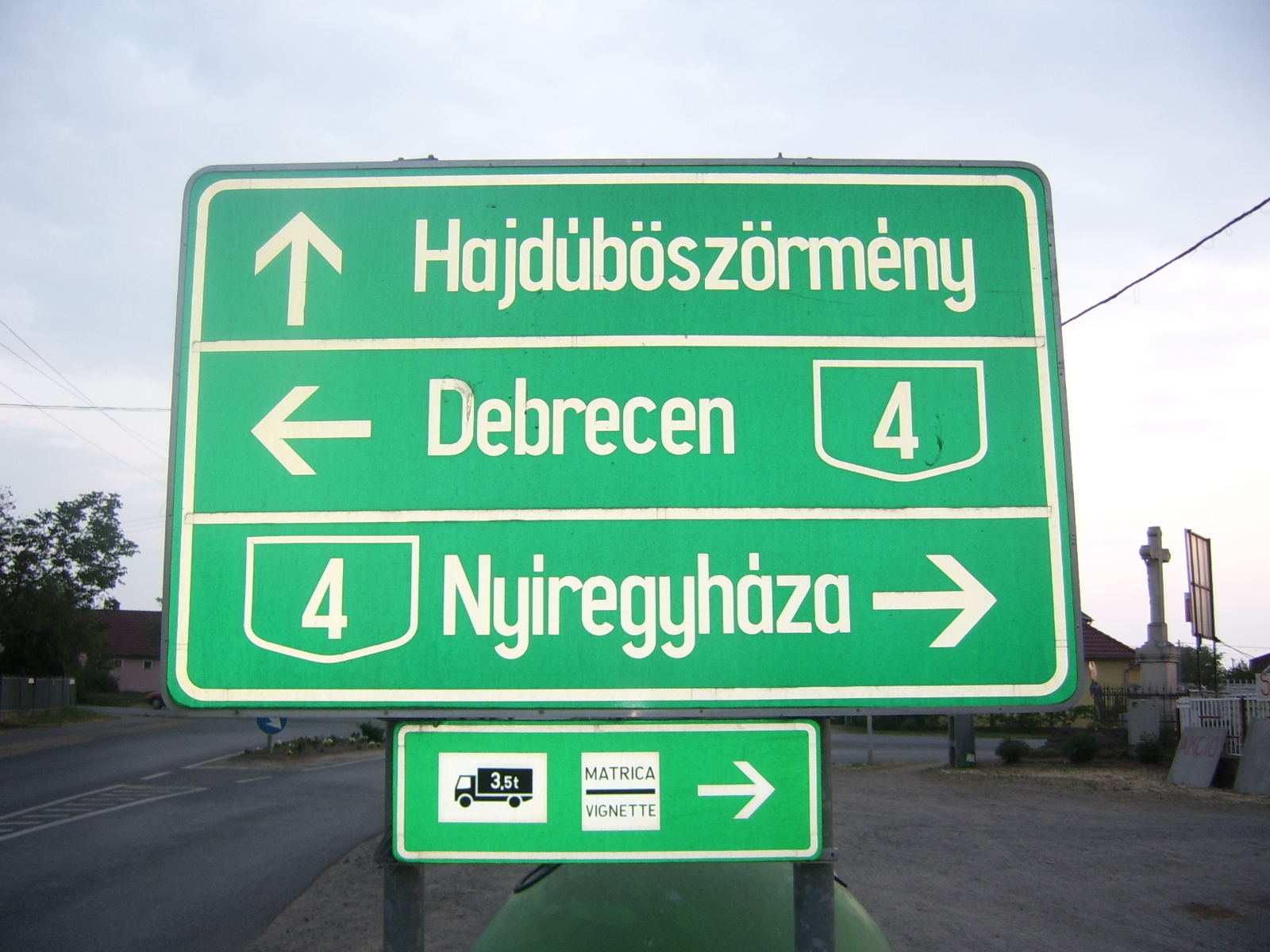
Hungarian-language road sign

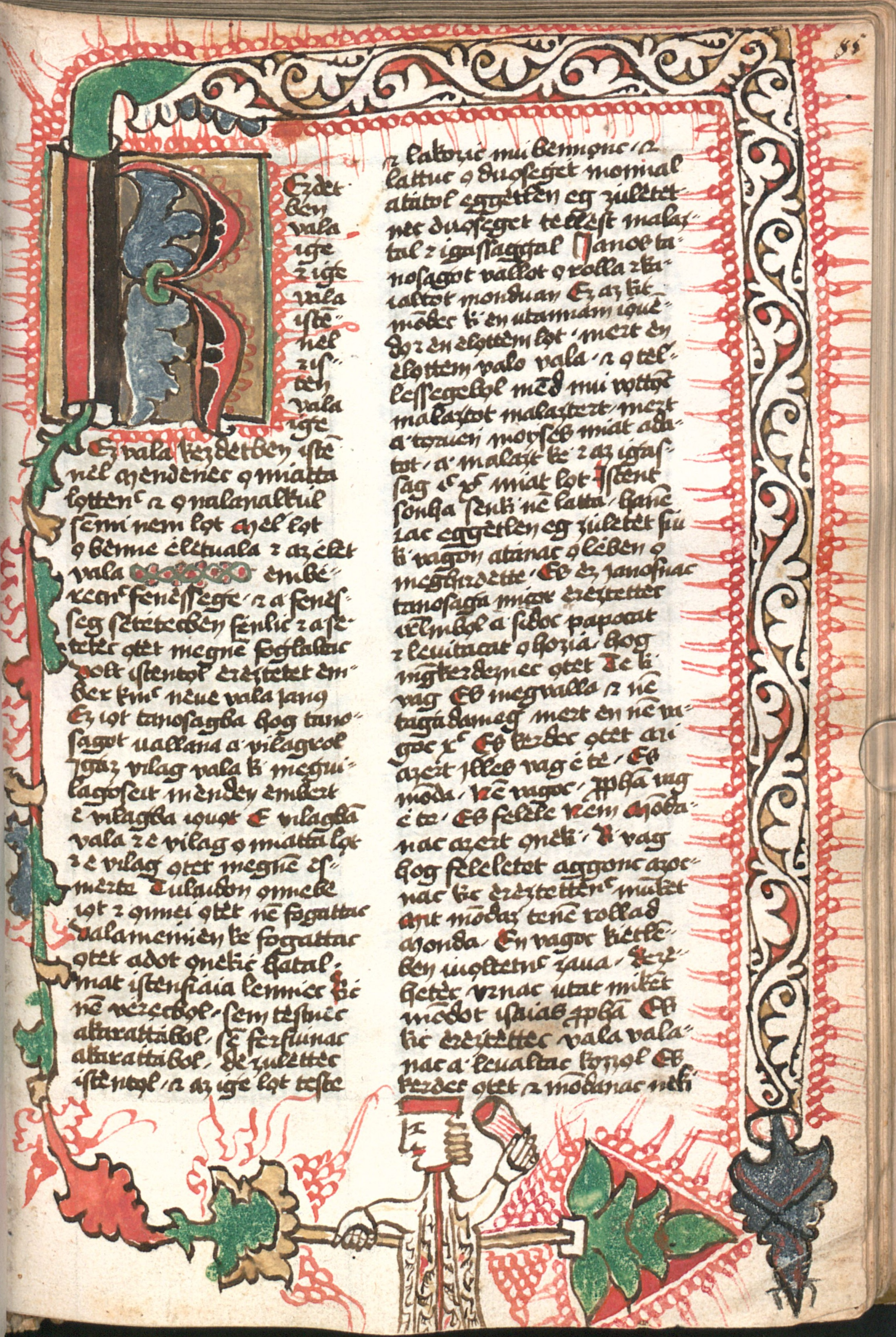
Medieval Hungarian book (a copy of the Hussite Bible), 1466

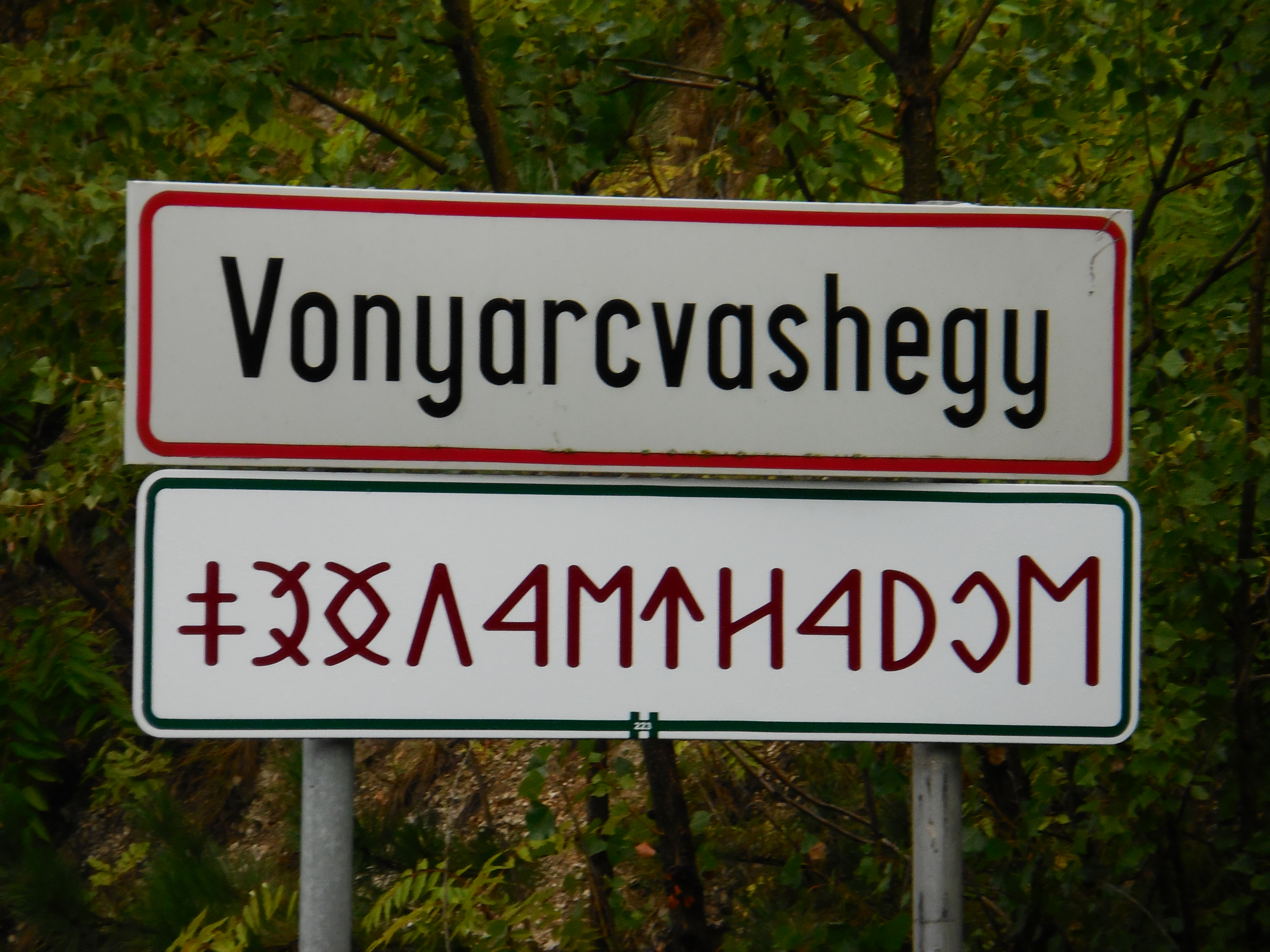
Street sign with a transcription to the runic writing system, used before Saint Stephen's State formation

The Hungarian language was originally written in right-to-left Old Hungarian runes, superficially similar in appearance to the better-known futhark runes but unrelated. After Stephen I of Hungary established the Kingdom of Hungary in the year 1000, the old system was gradually discarded in favour of the Latin alphabet and left-to-right order. Although now not used at all in everyday life, the old script is still known and practised by some enthusiasts.

Modern Hungarian is written using an expanded Latin alphabet and has a phonemic orthography, i.e. pronunciation can generally be predicted from the written language. In addition to the standard letters of the Latin alphabet, Hungarian uses several modified Latin characters to represent the additional vowel sounds of the language. These include letters with acute accents (á, é, í, ó, ú) to represent long vowels, and umlauts (ö and ü) and their long counterparts ő and ű to represent front vowels. Sometimes (usually as a result of a technical glitch on a computer) ⟨ô⟩ or ⟨õ⟩ is used for ⟨ő⟩, and ⟨û⟩ for ⟨ű⟩. This is often due to the limitations of the Latin-1 / ISO-8859-1 code page. These letters are not part of the Hungarian language and are considered misprints. Hungarian can be properly represented with the Latin-2 / ISO-8859-2 code page, but this code page is not always available. (Hungarian is the only language using both ⟨ő⟩ and ⟨ű⟩.) Unicode includes them, and so they can be used on the Internet.

Additionally, the digraphs (letter pairs) ⟨ny⟩, ⟨ty⟩, and ⟨gy⟩ are used to represent the palatal consonants /ɲ/, /c/, and /ɟ/ (roughly analogous to the "d+y" sounds in British "duke" or American "would you")—produced using a similar mechanism as the letter "d" when pronounced with the tongue pointing to the palate.

Hungarian uses ⟨s⟩ for /ʃ/ and ⟨sz⟩ for /s/, which is the reverse of Polish usage. The letter ⟨zs⟩ is /ʒ/ and ⟨cs⟩ is /t͡ʃ/. These digraphs are considered single letters in the alphabet. The letter ⟨ly⟩ is also a "single letter digraph", but is pronounced like /j/ (English ⟨y⟩) and appears mostly in old words. The letters ⟨dz⟩ and ⟨dzs⟩ /d͡ʒ/ are exotic remnants and are hard to find even in longer texts. Some examples still in common use are madzag ("string"), edzeni ("to train (athletically)") and dzsungel ("jungle").

Sometimes additional information is required for partitioning words with digraphs: házszám ("street number") = ház ("house") + szám ("number"), not an unintelligible házs + zám.

Hungarian distinguishes between long and short vowels, with long vowels written with acutes. It also distinguishes between long and short consonants, with long consonants being doubled. For example, lenni ("to be"), hozzászólás ("comment"). The digraphs, when pronounced as long consonants, are written as trigraphs: ⟨sz⟩ + ⟨sz⟩ = ⟨ssz⟩, e.g. művésszel ("with an artist"). But when a word is hyphenated at such a doubled digraph, the digraph is written out in full both before and after the hyphen. For example, ("with a bus"):

... busz-
szal...

When the first lexeme of a compound ends in a digraph and the second lexeme starts with the same digraph, both digraphs are written out: jegy + gyűrű = jegygyűrű ("engagement/wedding ring", jegy means "sign", "mark". The term jegyben lenni/járni means "to be engaged"; gyűrű means "ring").

Almost all trigraphs found in Hungarian text are the result of doubled digraphs, but there are a few exceptions: tizennyolc ("eighteen") is a concatenation of tizen + nyolc. Hungarian has minimal pairs of single vs. double consonants, for example tol ("push") vs. toll ("feather" or "pen").

While to English speakers they may seem unusual at first, once the new orthography and pronunciation are learned, written Hungarian is almost completely phonemic (except for etymological spellings and "ly, j" representing /j/).

== Word order ==
The word order is basically from general to specific. This is a typical analytical approach and is used generally in Hungarian.

=== Name order ===
The Hungarian language uses the so-called eastern name order, in which the surname (general, deriving from the family) comes first and the given name comes last. If a second given name is used, this follows the first given name.

==== Hungarian names in foreign languages ====
For clarity, in foreign languages Hungarian names are usually represented in the western name order. Sometimes, however, especially in countries neighbouring Hungary – where there is a significant Hungarian population – the Hungarian name order is retained, as it causes less confusion there.

For an example of foreign use, the birth name of the Hungarian-born physicist called the "father of the hydrogen bomb" was Teller Ede, but he immigrated to the United States in the 1930s and thus became known as Edward Teller. Prior to the mid-20th century, given names were usually translated along with the name order; this is no longer as common. For example, the pianist uses András Schiff when abroad, not Andrew Schiff (in Hungarian Schiff András). If a second given name is present, it becomes a middle name and is usually written out in full, rather than truncated to an initial.

==== Foreign names in Hungarian ====
In modern usage, foreign names retain their order when used in Hungarian. Therefore:

- Amikor Kiss János Los Angelesben volt, látta John Travoltát. (means: When János Kiss was in Los Angeles he saw John Travolta.)

The Hungarian name Kiss János is in the Hungarian name order (János is equivalent to John), but the foreign name John Travolta remains in the western name order.

Before the 20th century, not only was it common to reverse the order of foreign personalities, they were also "Hungarianised": Goethe János Farkas (originally Johann Wolfgang Goethe). This usage sounds odd today, when only a few well-known personalities are referred to using their Hungarianised names, including Verne Gyula (Jules Verne), Marx Károly (Karl Marx), Kolumbusz Kristóf (Christopher Columbus; the last of these is also translated in English from the original Italian or possibly Ligurian).

Some native speakers disapprove of this usage; the names of certain historical religious personalities (including popes), however, are always Hungarianised by practically all speakers, such as Luther Márton (Martin Luther), Husz János (Jan Hus), Kálvin János (John Calvin); just like the names of monarchs, for example the king of Spain, Juan Carlos I is referred to as I. János Károly or the late queen of the UK, Elizabeth II would be referred to as II. Erzsébet.

Japanese names, which are usually written in western order in the rest of Europe, retain their original order in Hungarian, e. g. Kuroszava Akira instead of Akira Kurosawa.

==== Date and time ====
As in Japanese, Chinese, and Korean, the Hungarian convention for date and time is to go from the general to the specific, starting with the year first, then month, then day.

==== Addresses ====
Although address formatting is increasingly being influenced by standard European conventions, the traditional Hungarian style is:

1052 Budapest, Deák Ferenc tér 1.

So the order is: 1) postcode 2) settlement (most general), 3) street/square/etc. (more specific), 4) house number (most specific). The house number may be followed by the storey and door numbers.

Addresses on envelopes and postal parcels should be formatted and placed on the right side as follows:

Name of the recipient
Settlement
Street address (up to door number if necessary)
(HU-)postcode

The HU- part before the postcode is only for incoming postal traffic from foreign countries.

== Vocabulary examples ==
Note: The stress is always placed on the first syllable of each word. The remaining syllables all receive an equal, lesser stress. All syllables are pronounced clearly and evenly, even at the end of a sentence, unlike in English.

=== Example text ===
Article 1 of the Universal Declaration of Human Rights in Hungarian:

Minden emberi lény szabadon születik és egyenlő méltósága és joga van. Az emberek, ésszel és lelkiismerettel bírván, egymással szemben testvéri szellemben kell hogy viseltessenek.

Article 1 of the Universal Declaration of Human Rights in English:

All human beings are born free and equal in dignity and rights. They are endowed with reason and conscience and should act towards one another in a spirit of brotherhood.

Hungarian pronunciation

=== Numbers ===
Source: Wiktionary

| English | Hungarian | IPA |
|---|---|---|
| zero | nulla | /ˈnulːɒ/ |
| one | egy | /ˈɛɟː/ |
| two | kettő | /ˈkɛtːøː/ |
| three | három | /ˈhaːrom/ |
| four | négy | /ˈneːɟ/ |
| five | öt | /ˈøt/ |
| six | hat | /ˈhɒt/ |
| seven | hét | /ˈheːt/ |
| eight | nyolc | /ˈɲolt͡s/ |
| nine | kilenc | /ˈkilɛnt͡s/ |
| ten | tíz | /ˈtiːz/ |

| English | Hungarian | IPA |
|---|---|---|
| eleven | tizenegy | /ˈtizɛnɛɟː/ |
| twelve | tizenkettő | /ˈtizɛŋkɛtːøː/ |
| thirteen | tizenhárom | /ˈtizɛnɦaːrom/ |
| fourteen | tizennégy | /ˈtizɛnːeːɟ/ |
| fifteen | tizenöt | /ˈtizɛnøt/ |
| sixteen | tizenhat | /ˈtizɛnɦɒt/ |
| seventeen | tizenhét | /ˈtizɛnɦeːt/ |
| eighteen | tizennyolc | /ˈtizɛɲːolt͡s/ |
| nineteen | tizenkilenc | /ˈtizɛŋkilɛnt͡s/ |
| twenty | húsz | /ˈhuːs/ |

| English | Hungarian | IPA |
|---|---|---|
| twenty-one | huszonegy | /ˈhusonɛɟː/ |
| twenty-two | huszonkettő | /ˈhusoŋkɛtːøː/ |
| twenty-three | huszonhárom | /ˈhusonɦaːrom/ |
| twenty-four | huszonnégy | /ˈhusonːeːɟ/ |
| twenty-five | huszonöt | /ˈhusonøt/ |
| twenty-six | huszonhat | /ˈhusonɦɒt/ |
| twenty-seven | huszonhét | /ˈhusonɦeːt/ |
| twenty-eight | huszonnyolc | /ˈhusoɲːolt͡s/ |
| twenty-nine | huszonkilenc | /ˈhusoŋkilɛnt͡s/ |
| thirty | harminc | /ˈhɒrmint͡s/ |
| forty | negyven | /ˈnɛɟvɛn/ |
| fifty | ötven | /ˈøtvɛn/ |
| sixty | hatvan | /ˈhɒtvɒn/ |
| seventy | hetven | /ˈhɛtvɛn/ |
| eighty | nyolcvan | /ˈɲolt͡svɒn/ |
| ninety | kilencven | /ˈkilɛnt͡svɛn/ |

| English | Hungarian | IPA |
|---|---|---|
| one hundred | száz | /ˈsaːz/ |
| one thousand | ezer | /ˈɛzɛr/ |
| two thousand | kétezer (kettőezer) | /ˈkeːtɛzɛr/ (/ˈkettøːɛzɛr/) |
| two thousand (and) nineteen (2019) | kétezer-tizenkilenc (kettőezertizenkilenc) | /ˈkeːtɛzɛrtizɛŋkilɛnt͡s/ (/ˈkettøːɛzɛrtizɛŋkilɛnt͡s/) |
| one million | egymillió | /ˈɛɟmilːiʲoː/ |
| one billion (10^{9}) | egymilliárd | /ˈɛɟmilːiʲaːrd/ |

=== Time ===
Days of the week
| English | Hungarian | IPA |
|---|---|---|
| Monday | hétfő | /ˈheːtføː/ |
| Tuesday | kedd | /ˈkɛdː/ |
| Wednesday | szerda | /ˈsɛrdɒ/ |
| Thursday | csütörtök | /ˈt͡ʃytørtøk/ |
| Friday | péntek | /ˈpeːntɛk/ |
| Saturday | szombat | /ˈsombɒt/ |
| Sunday | vasárnap | /ˈvɒʃaːrnɒp/ |

Months of the year
| English | Hungarian | IPA |
|---|---|---|
| January | január | /ˈjɒnuaːr/ |
| February | február | /ˈfɛbruaːr/ |
| March | március | /ˈmaːrt͡siʲuʃ/ |
| April | április | /ˈaːpriliʃ/ |
| May | május | /ˈmaːjuʃ/ |
| June | június | /ˈjuːniʲuʃ/ |
| July | július | /ˈjuːliʲuʃ/ |
| August | augusztus | /ˈɒuɡustuʃ/ |
| September | szeptember | /ˈsɛptɛmbɛr/ |
| October | október | /ˈoktoːbɛr/ |
| November | november | /ˈnovɛmbɛr/ |
| December | december | /ˈdɛt͡sɛmbɛr/ |

=== Conversation ===
- Hungarian (person, language): magyar [mɒɟɒr]
- Hello!:
  - Formal, when addressing a stranger: "Good day!": Jó napot (kívánok)! [joːnɒpot ki:vaːnok].
  - Informal, when addressing a close acquaintance: Szia! [siɒ] Szia is a version of the Latin origin loanword Servus.
- Good-bye!: Viszontlátásra! [visontlaːtaːʃrɒ] (formal) (see above), Viszlát! [vislaːt] (semi-informal), Szia! (informal: same stylistic remark as for "See you" or "Hello!" )
- Excuse me: Elnézést! [ɛlneːzeːʃt]
- Please:
  - Kérem (szépen) [keːrɛm seːpɛn] (This literally means "I'm asking (it/you) nicely", as in German Bitte schön. See next for a more common form of the polite request.)
  - Legyen szíves! [lɛɟɛn sivɛʃ] (literally: "Be (so) kind!")
- I would like ____, please: Szeretnék ____ [sɛrɛtneːk] (this example illustrates the use of the conditional tense, as a common form of a polite request; it literally means "I would like".)
- Sorry!: Bocsánat! [botʃaːnɒt]
- Thank you: Köszönöm [køsønøm]
- that/this: az [ɒz], ez [ɛz]
- How much?: Mennyi? [mɛɲːi]
- How much does it cost?: Mennyibe kerül? [mɛɲːibɛ kɛryl]
- Yes: Igen [iɡɛn]
- No: Nem [nɛm]
- I do not understand: Nem értem [nɛm eːrtɛm]
- I do not know: Nem tudom [nɛm tudom]
- Where's the toilet?:
  - Hol (van) a vécé? [hol vɒn ɒ veːtseː] (vécé/veːtseː is the Hungarian pronunciation of the English abbreviation of "Water Closet")
  - Hol (van) a mosdó? [hol vɒn ɒ moʒdoː] – more polite (and word-for-word) version
- generic toast: Egészségünkre! [ɛɡeːʃːeːɡyŋkrɛ] (literally: "To our health!")
- juice: gyümölcslé [ɟymøltʃleː]
- water: víz [viːz]
- wine: bor [bor]
- beer: sör [ʃør]
- tea: tea [tɛɒ]
- milk: tej [tɛj]
- Do you speak English?: Beszél(sz) angolul? [bɛseːl / bɛseːls ɒŋɡolul] The fact of asking is only shown by the proper intonation: continually rising until the penultimate syllable, then falling for the last one.
- I love you: Szeretlek [sɛrɛtlɛk]
- Help!: Segítség! [ʃɛɡiːtʃeːɡ]
- It is needed: kell
- I need to go: Mennem kell

== Recorded examples ==
A Hungarian speaker

A Hungarian speaker recorded in Taiwan

A bilingual speaker of Hungarian and Swabian, recorded in Perbál, Hungary

A native Icelandic speaker speaking Hungarian

== See also ==
- Hungarian grammar
- Hungarian verbs
- Hungarian noun phrase
- Hungarian phonology
- History of the Hungarian language
- Phonological history of Hungarian
- Hungarian dialects
- Hungarian Cultural Institute
- List of English words of Hungarian origin
- BABEL Speech Corpus
- Magyar szótár (Dictionary of the Hungarian Language)
- Szabadkai Friss Újság (1901), Hungarian language daily newspaper

== Bibliography ==
=== Courses ===
- MagyarOK – Text book and exercise book for beginners. Szita, Szilvia; Pelcz, Katalin (2013). Pécs; Pécsi Tudományegyetem. MagyarOK website ISBN 978-963-7178-68-9.
- Colloquial Hungarian – The complete course for beginners. Rounds, Carol H.; Sólyom, Erika (2002). London; New York: Routledge. ISBN 0-415-24258-4.

This book gives an introduction to the Hungarian language in 15 chapters. The dialogues are available on CDs.

- Teach Yourself Hungarian – A complete course for beginners. Pontifex, Zsuzsa (1993). London: Hodder & Stoughton. Chicago: NTC/Contemporary Publishing. ISBN 0-340-56286-2.

This is a complete course in spoken and written Hungarian. The course consists of 21 chapters with dialogues, culture notes, grammar and exercises. The dialogues are available on cassette.

- Hungarolingua 1 – Magyar nyelvkönyv. Hoffmann, István; et al. (1996). Debreceni Nyári Egyetem. ISBN 963-472-083-8
- Hungarolingua 2 – Magyar nyelvkönyv. Hlavacska, Edit; et al. (2001). Debreceni Nyári Egyetem. ISBN 963-03-6698-3
- Hungarolingua 3 – Magyar nyelvkönyv. Hlavacska, Edit; et al. (1999). Debreceni Nyári Egyetem. ISBN 963-472-083-8

These course books were developed by the University of Debrecen Summer School program for teaching Hungarian to foreigners. The books are written completely in Hungarian and therefore unsuitable for self study. There is an accompanying 'dictionary' with translations of the Hungarian vocabulary into English, German, and French for the words used in the first two books.

- "NTC's Hungarian and English Dictionary" by Magay and Kiss. ISBN 0-8442-4968-8 (You may be able to find a newer edition also. This one is 1996.)

=== Grammars ===
- Gyakorló magyar nyelvtan / A Practical Hungarian grammar (2009, 2010). Szita Szilvia, Görbe Tamás. Budapest: Akadémiai Kiadó. 978 963 05 8703 7.
- A practical Hungarian grammar (3rd, rev. ed.). Keresztes, László (1999). Debrecen: Debreceni Nyári Egyetem. ISBN 963-472-300-4.
- Simplified Grammar of the Hungarian Language (1882). Ignatius Singer. London: Trübner & Co.
- Practical Hungarian grammar: [a compact guide to the basics of Hungarian grammar]. Törkenczy, Miklós (2002). Budapest: Corvina. ISBN 963-13-5131-9.
- Hungarian verbs and essentials of grammar: a practical guide to the mastery of Hungarian (2nd ed.). Törkenczy, Miklós (1999). Budapest: Corvina; Lincolnwood, [Ill.]: Passport Books. ISBN 963-13-4778-8.
- Hungarian: an essential grammar (2nd ed.). Rounds, Carol (2009). London; New York: Routledge. ISBN 0-415-77737-2.
- Hungarian: Descriptive grammar. Kenesei, István, Robert M. Vago, and Anna Fenyvesi (1998). London; New York: Routledge. ISBN 0-415-02139-1.
- Hungarian Language Learning References (including the short reviews of three of the above books)
- Noun Declension Tables – HUNGARIAN. Budapest: Pons. Klett. ISBN 978-963-9641-04-4
- Verb Conjugation Tables – HUNGARIAN. Budapest: Pons. Klett. ISBN 978-963-9641-03-7

=== Others ===
- Abondolo, Daniel Mario: Hungarian Inflectional Morphology. Akadémiai publishing. Budapest, 1988. ISBN 9630546302
- Balázs, Géza: The Story of Hungarian. A Guide to the Language. Translated by Thomas J. DeKornfeld. Corvina publishing. Budapest, 1997. ISBN 9631343626
- Stephanides, Éva H. (ed.): Contrasting English with Hungarian. Akadémiai publishing. Budapest, 1986. ISBN 9630539500
- Szende, Tamás (December 1994). "Hungarian". Journal of the International Phonetic Association. 24 (2). Cambridge University Press: 91–94. doi:10.1017/S0025100300005090. S2CID 242632087.
