= Hungarian dialects =

Overview of dialects of the Hungarian language by region and country

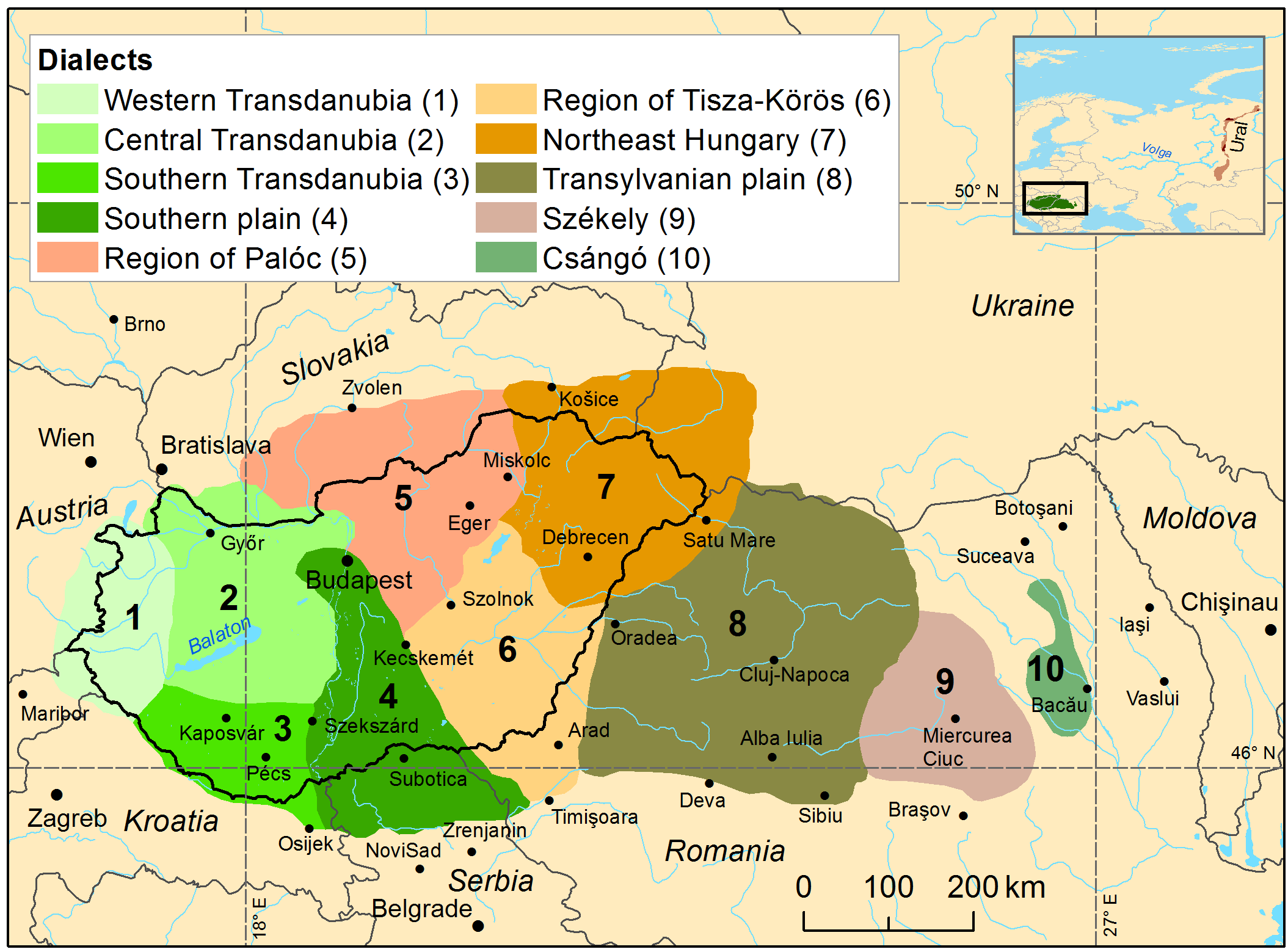
The geographic distribution of Hungarian dialects

Hungarian has ten dialects. These are fully mutually intelligible, and do not differ significantly from standard Hungarian except for the Csángó dialect. They are mostly distinguished by pronunciation; although there are differences in vocabulary, these are usually small and do not hinder intelligibility. Due to increased internal migration and urbanization during the 20th century, most of the characteristics of the different dialects can only be observed in smaller towns and villages, and even there mostly among the elderly; the population of the larger cities and especially the capital has been mixed for generations and the dialectal differences have been lost. A notable exception is the Western Transdanubian pronunciation, which is distinctly noticeable even in Szombathely, the largest city in the region.

The following dialectal regions are currently distinguished by researchers:

1. Western Transdanubian
2. Central Transdanubian – Little Hungarian Plain
3. Southern Transdanubian
4. Southern Great Plain (+Tisza–Körös)
5. Palóc
6. Northeastern
7. Transylvanian Plain (Mezőség)
8. Székely
9. Moldavian (Csángó)

The last three are spoken outside the current territory of Hungary, in parts of Romania. The Csángó dialect is spoken primarily in Bacău County in eastern Romania. The Csángó Hungarian group has been largely isolated from other Hungarian people, and they therefore preserved a dialect closely resembling an earlier form of Hungarian.

A former classification distinguished the following dialects: Great Hungarian Plain, West Danube, Danube-Tisza (territories between the two rivers), King's Pass Hungarian (Pass in Apuseni Mountains), Northeast Hungarian, Northwest Hungarian, Székely, West Hungarian and Csángó. This classification was also used by Ethnologue, with the exception of the Csángó dialect, which was mentioned but not listed separately.

In addition there are seven dialects of Hungarian Sign Language.

== Dialects ==
=== Western Transdanubian dialect ===
Formerly called West Hungarian. Due to the proximity of Austria its vocabulary is somewhat affected by German; for "yes", German ja is commonly substituted for standard Hungarian igen. Its pronunciation is characterized by the shortening of long vowels (tüz instead of standard tűz, buza instead of búza) and the lengthening of consonants (esső instead of standard eső, szöllő instead of szőlő). This dialect also uses the ë (closed "e") vowel profusely. The consonant "l" is often lost after a long vowel or at the end of words. Consonants are often palatalized (huirnyi instead of standard írni), however, "ly" (originally a palatalized "l" in the dialect from which standard Hungarian evolved) becomes "l" instead of the more common "j".

=== Central Transdanubian / Little Hungarian Plain dialect and Southern Transdanubian dialect ===
Formerly called Transdanubian dialect. Central Transdanubian has several subdialects including the Csallóköz, the Mátyusföld and the Szigetköz dialects. These dialects share some similarities with Western Transdanubian, both in pronunciation and in vocabulary, but the latter was also affected by the South Slavic languages, due to their geographical proximity. Ja for igen is common; they distinguish between open and closed e sound, though here it is the open e that differs from standard Hungarian, sounding more like a short a.

=== Southern Great Plain dialect or Southern dialect ===
Spoken mostly between the rivers Danube and Tisza; also in the Banat. This was also the dialect of Budapest and its surroundings. Its vocabulary does not show significant differences from standard Hungarian; its dialect words come from Transdanubian, Palóc and Tisza regions. This has historical causes: the area suffered the most significant losses during Hungary's Ottoman occupation in the 16th-17th centuries, and was repopulated from different regions of the country. In pronunciation it often uses a vowel which is a cross between "e" and "ö".

=== Palóc or Northwestern dialect ===
Spoken in the northwestern part of the Cisdanubian region; mostly in the counties of Nógrád, Heves and the former county of Borsod (now the western half of Borsod-Abaúj-Zemplén), a part of Pest and Bács-Kiskun; also spoken in Southern Slovakia. Its vocabulary may use words from Slovak. Standard a is substituted by a short á, while standard á is substituted by a vowel closer to standard ó. Its best known distinguishing characteristic is the use of diphthongs (au in place of standard o, ie in place of é). It is one of the few dialects that still pronounce ly, the palatalized version of l which, in other dialects, has already merged into another consonant (in standard and in most dialects into j, in some dialects into l.)

=== Tisza-Körös dialect or Eastern dialect ===
Formerly called Tisza dialect. It is spoken east of the river Tisza, also by Hungarians living in Romania. It has vocabulary similarities with the nearby Transylvanian Plain dialect. Its pronunciation is marked by the use of í instead of the standard é: níz instead of néz, píz instead of pénz. East of Debrecen the vowel e is commonly pronounced instead of standard ö (ser instead of sör), though not in all words. As common in dialects this side of the Danube, open and closed e is not distinguished. The consonants l, r and j at the end of a syllable often lengthen its vowel.

=== Northeastern dialect ===
Spoken in the eastern part of Borsod-Abaúj-Zemplén County (mostly in the former county Zemplén), also in Szabolcs-Szatmár-Bereg County, Ukraine and parts of Slovakia. It was the main dialect of the region where important literary figures such as Ferenc Kazinczy (leading figure of the reforming and revitalizing of Hungarian in the 18th century) and Ferenc Kölcsey (also a language reformer, author of the National Anthem) lived and worked; also, of Vizsoly, where the first extant Hungarian Bible translation was published. Due to the dialect forming the basis of standard literary Hungarian, it has no significant differences from it, although it is not identical with it. The small differences are mainly in vocabulary, though in some parts, close to the connecting Tisza-Körös region, í is commonly pronounced instead of standard e and there are differences in verb conjugation – a distinctive characteristics that was not adopted by standard Hungarian is the different future tense of auxiliary verbs kell ("must", "have to") and lehet ("may", "might"), with kell lesz and lehet lesz used instead of the standard kell majd and lehet majd. The dialect's characteristics, such as not differentiating between open and closed e, and pronouncing the consonant ly, have had a lasting effect on the standardized spelling of Hungarian.

=== Transylvanian Plain dialect ===
Formerly called King's Pass, after a mountain pass in Transylvania. It is spoken in the non-Székely parts of Transylvania, a region of Romania formerly belonging to Hungary. Its characteristics are the pronunciation of a instead of standard o (bagár instead of standard bogár), and á instead of a. In several parts of the region the vowels are shortened (házbol instead of házból). Interestingly, it retains the preterite tense, the use of which has been steadily declining in other dialects since the Middle Hungarian period; in standard Hungarian its last appearance was in literary texts of the second half of the 19th century, and it has been obsolete since then.

=== Székely dialect ===
The dialect most commonly associated with Transylvania has a distinctive vocabulary. Together with the region's traditions and folk culture it has given rise to significant literary works. The Székely dialect makes use of several Romanian loan words, which are not always understood by speakers of standard Hungarian.

=== Moldavian dialect ===
Commonly called the Csángó dialect, this dialect differs the most from standard Hungarian, as a result of isolation from other Hungarian regions. The region where it is spoken is completely separated from the current territory of Hungary. The dialect has two subdialects: the archaic dialect and the Székely-Csángó dialect, the former being the only independently developed dialect of Hungarian, and could also be considered a regional language, while the latter was heavily influenced by the neighbouring Székely dialect. The Romanian census lists Csángó speakers separately from Hungarians.

The archaic Csángó dialect still retains several characteristics of Middle Hungarian, the medieval version of Hungarian, but has a number of Romanian loanwords. Due to its extensive use of archaisms and words specific to the dialect, it is difficult to understand even for Hungarians who also speak Romanian. It has about 10–15,000 speakers, with a further 10–13,000 speakers who use a mixture of Archaic and Székely-Csángó dialects.

Székely-Csángó dialect shows similarities with Székely subdialects, but it lacks words created during the language reform and has a larger number of Romanian loanwords. The majority of Csángós, around 40,000 persons, speak this dialect.

=== Romungro dialect ===
The Romungro dialect is a version of Hungarian used by Roma people living in Hungary in various stages of assimilation. A large number of Hungarian Roma do not speak their original languages (Lovari or Boyash) any more, but Romungro has a large number of loan words from them. Original Romani words are conjugated in accordance with the rules of Hungarian grammar; the Romani effect on Romungro can be observed mostly in the vocabulary. Some words have meanings that in standard Hungarian are expressed by a related word (for example a sly person using other persons for personal gain would be referred to as a snake in standard Hungarian and as a reptile in Romungro). The dialect also has its own proverbs. It has regional differences, which are hard to ascertain, as the dialect is poorly researched, but several typical characteristics are known, such as pronouncing á instead of standard a, ű instead of ő, u instead of o, í instead of é. Several words or suffixes are shortened, for example the inessive suffix -ban and the illative suffix -ba are merged (in standard Hungarian this is usually a sign of someone being uneducated, which does not help the dialect's status in public opinion). The dialect has a distinctive intonation which easily lends itself to imitation by comedians mocking Roma or lower-class Hungarian people. Despite its low status, several of its Romani loanwords have found their way into standard Hungarian, although mostly as slang words. This means that the dialect is completely intelligible for speakers of standard Hungarian.

== See also ==
- History of the Hungarian language
- Funeral Sermon and Prayer
- Lamentations of Mary
