= History of the Hungarian language =

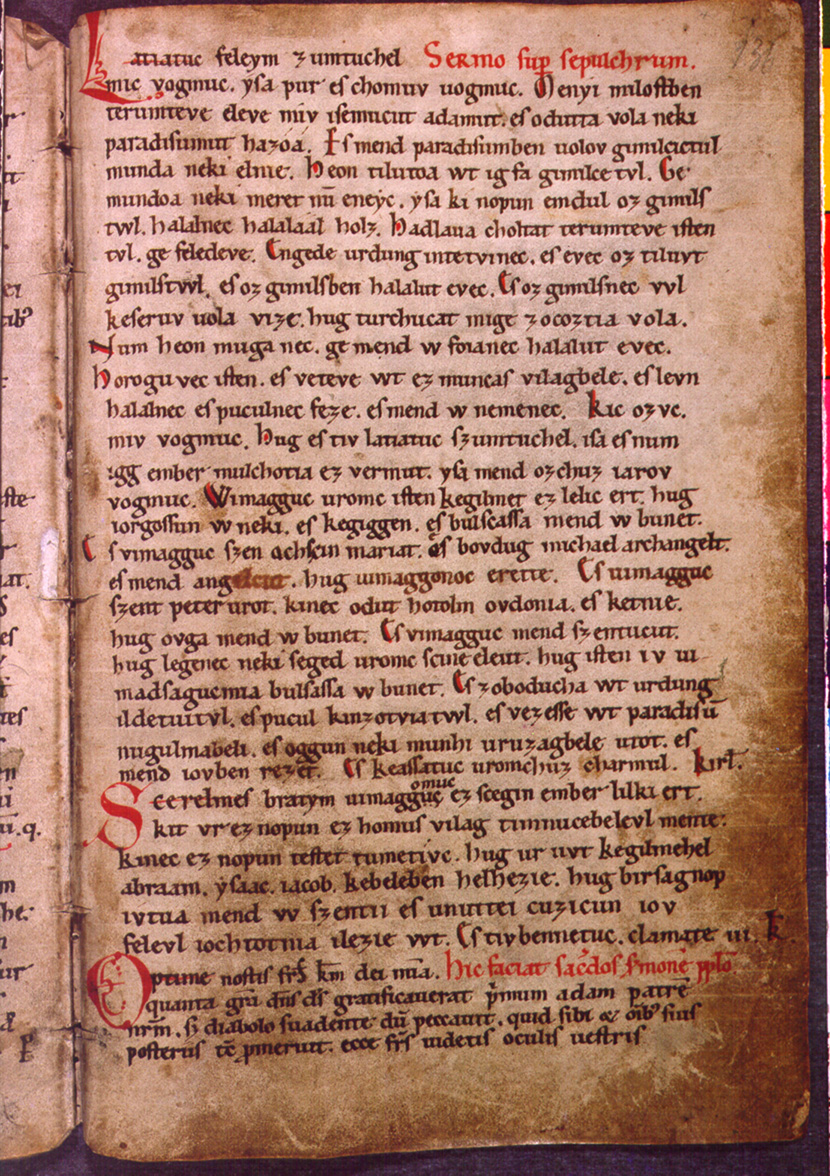
The "Funeral Sermon and Prayer". This text, dated to 1192, is the oldest longer Hungarian-only document. Earlier, Hungarian sentences and words appeared in Latin context.

Hungarian is a Uralic language of the Ugric group. It has been spoken in the region of modern-day Hungary since the Hungarian conquest of the Carpathian Basin in the late 9th century.

Hungarian's ancestral language probably separated from the Ob-Ugric languages during the Bronze Age. There is no attestation for a period of close to two millennia. Records in Old Hungarian begin fragmentarily in epigraphy in the Old Hungarian script beginning in the 10th century; isolated Hungarian words are attested in manuscript tradition from the turn of the 11th century. The oldest surviving coherent text in Old Hungarian is the Funeral Sermon and Prayer, dated to 1192. The sermon begins with the words Latiatuc feleym zumtuchel mic vogmuc. yſa pur eſ chomuv uogmuc (/laːtjaːtuk fɛlɛim symtyxːɛl mik vɔɟmuk iʃaː por eʃ xɔmou vɔɟmuk/ — "Do you see, my friends, what we are: truly, we are only dust and ash.") The first Hungarian translation of the Bible is the Hussite Bible, dated to 1416.

The Old Hungarian period by convention covers Medieval Hungary, from the initial invasion of Pannonia in AD 896, to the collapse of the Kingdom of Hungary following the Battle of Mohács of 1526. Printing begins during Middle Hungarian, from 1526 to 1772, i.e. from the first books printed in Hungarian to the Age of Enlightenment, which prompted language reforms that resulted in the Modern Hungarian language.

Events of the 1530s and 1540s brought a new situation to the country: the time of Humanism – which had flourished only a few decades earlier under Matthias Corvinus – was over; the population, both in villages and towns, was terrorized by Ottoman raids; the majority of the country was lost; and the remainder began to feel the problems of the new Habsburg rule. This predicament caused backwardness in the cultural life as well. However, Hungary, with the great territorial and human losses, soon entered into a new cultural era, the Reformation. This religious movement heartened many authors to find new ways. Cultural life was primarily based in Transylvania, but Royal Hungary also saw the rebirth of the Hungarian culture.

The first printed book written in Hungarian was printed in Kraków in the Kingdom of Poland in 1533. It is a partial Bible translation, containing the Pauline epistles. The translation was done by Benedek Komjáti. The New Testament's first printed edition was published by János Sylvester (1541). He also composed the first scientific analysis of the Hungarian language, in 1539, titled "Grammatica Hungarolatina". Like Komjáti, Sylvester printed his works in Cracow. The previous publications, however, were not Protestant in their sense. The first directly reformed Hungarian book was Imre Ozorai's Argument, published in Cracow, in 1535.

Among other works, Aesop's Fables – a collection of moral short stories – was first translated into Hungarian by Gábor Pesti (1536). These are the first denoted Hungarian short stories. The first attempt to standardize Hungarian was by Mátyás Bíró Dévai. He proposed a logical and feasible orthography to the language. His book, Orthographia, is known from its second edition, printed in 1549.

== Prehistory ==
=== Separation from Common Uralic ===
The history of the Hungarian language begins with the Uralic era, in the Neolithic age, when the linguistic ancestors of all Uralic languages coexisted in the area of the Ural Mountains.

Category	Word in Hungarian	Meaning	Reconstructed Proto-Uralic	Notes	Cognate in Finnish
Fishing, water	hal	'fish'	*kala		kala
Fishing, water	tat	'(a kind of) fish'	*totki 'tench'	See note 2.	totki (Tinca tinca)
Fishing, water	háló	mesh	*kalaw		kalin
Fishing, water	víz	water	*weti		vete-
Fishing, water	folyó	'river'	*juka	See note 3.	joki
Fishing, water	ár	flood	(Ugric) *sarV		
Fishing, water	láp	fen, bog	*loppi		
Hunting, animals	ideg	nerve	*jänti 'string'		jänne 'tendon, sinew'
Hunting, animals	ín	fibre	*sëxni 'vein'		suoni
Hunting, animals	íj	bow	*joŋsi		jousi
Hunting, animals	nyíl	arrow	*ńëxli		nuoli
Hunting, animals	fogoly	partridge	*püŋi		pyy
Hunting, animals	nyúl	hare	*ńomala		
Hunting, animals	holló	raven	*kulaka		
Daily life	fő(z)	cook	*pexi(-ta)		
Daily life	fazék	pan	*pata		pata
Daily life	mony	'bird egg'	*muna	See note 4.	muna
Daily life	fon	spin	*puna 'braid'		puno
Daily life	öv	belt	*wüŋä		vyö
Daily life	vas	iron	*waśki		vaski 'copper'
Family	apa	'father'	*ëppi 'father-in-law'		
Family	fele(ség)	'wife'	*pälä 'half'		
Family	meny	'daughter-in-law'	*mińä		miniä
Family	vő	'son-in-law'	*wäŋiw		vävy
Family	napa	'mother-in-law'	*ana-ëppi		anoppi

Many Hungarian words, particularly among the language's most basic vocabulary (cf. Swadesh list) are traced back to common Uralic origin: words of a corresponding shape occur in other Uralic languages as well, and linguists have not been able to classify them as loanwords. Those that are not present in the Samoyedic languages are commonly also described as being of Finno-Ugric origin, but the existence of a definite distinction between "Uralic" and "Finno-Ugric" is disputed. (See Uralic languages#Traditional classification.)

As the Uralic unity disintegrated between the 4th and the 2nd millennium BC, the speakers of Samoyedic languages moved eastwards, while others, such as the Finnic and Hungarian speakers, moved westward. Hungarian and the Ob-Ugric languages show several similarities and are known as the Ugric group, which is commonly (but not universally) considered a proper sub-branch of Uralic: that is, the Hungarian and Ob-Ugric languages would descend from a common Proto-Ugric language. The speakers of Ugric languages were still living close together approximately until 1000 BC, when the ancestors of Hungarians separated for good from the Ob-Ugrians.

=== Proto-Hungarian ===
Around 1000 BC, the linguistic ancestors of the Hungarians had moved southwest from their previous territories, the region west of the Ural Mountains, the eastern frontier of Europe; hence the Hungarian language separated from its closest relatives, the Ob-Ugric languages, which further divided into the Mansi language and the Khanty language. (This split may have occurred only later, and their speakers were influenced by an Asian, possibly Western-Siberian tribe, as the Mansis and Khantys moved northeast.) Proto-Hungarian likely had contacts with the Permic languages at this time, as indicated by a nontrivial number of shared vocabulary and sound developments (which are not found in the other Uralic languages).

The Hungarians gradually changed their way of living from settled hunting to nomadic cattle-raising. Their most important animals included sheep and cattle. There are no written sources on the era, thus little is known about it.

After a long journey, the Hungarians had settled the coastal region of the northeastern Black Sea (Levédia). With the fall of Attila's empire, the Huns had receded to this area, and established their new state, which also ruled over the Hungarians. A possible memoir of this is a Hungarian myth of Hunor and Magor. According to the legend they were the twin sons of King Nimrod and the ancestors of the Huns and the Magyars (Hungarians) respectively.

After the Hunnish rule ended, the Hungarians came into contact with the Göktürks and were significantly influenced by them. The Göktürk Turk Empire flourished in the 6th century. This is probably the time when the Hungarians started writing, using the Old Hungarian script (rovásírás). Later, the Hungarians also came into contact with the Khazars and moved westward to Etelköz, where the Magyars lived as an independent nation.

In 895–896, under the rulership of Prince Árpád, they crossed the Carpathian Mountains, and settled the Carpathian Basin, the area of present-day Hungary. They also began to establish their own state here, namely the Principality of Hungary. They launched a number of plundering raids both westward into former Francia and southward into the Byzantine Empire.

A saying or prayer mentioning the exonym "Hungarians" (Hungari) was common in the 10th century, at the time of intense raiding of various parts of Europe by these tribes. It's attested in the Song of the Watchmen of Modena in 924 AD:

    A sagittis Hungarorum libera nos Domine!
    ‘Lord save us from the arrows of the Hungarians!’

The Hungarians call themselves Magyar (Hungarian pronunciation: [ˈmɒɟɒr]). The name Magyar once was the name of a Hungarian tribe, Megyer(i), which likely means "talking man". The first syllable may be cognate to the ethnonym Mansi, which in the Mansi language (манси mańśi) means simply 'man, Mansi'. The (Ob-)Ugric word has been proposed to be an old Indo-Iranian loan (cf. Sanskrit mānuṣa, Avestan manuš "man, male"). The external name 'Hungary' (Hungaria) was recorded in the 13th century by Anonymous in the Gesta Hungarorum ("The Deeds of the Hungarians)", the first extant Hungarian chronicle, as originating in the 9th century from the castle Ung (Hung) now in Slovakia.

    ...et uocatus est Arpad Dux Hunguarie, et ab Hungu omnes sui milites uocati sunt Hunguari... 
    ‘...and he was called Árpád Duke of Hungary, and from Ung all his warriors were called Hungarians...’[7]

==== Early loanwords ====
There are some really early loanwords in Hungarian, which enriched the language's vocabulary, estimated to 25,000 words at the time. Here are some examples:

Origin	Loans before the separation from the Ob-Ugric languages	Loans after the separation from the Ob-Ugric languages
Iranian	arany 'gold'; szarv 'horn'; száz 'hundred'	ezer 'thousand', híd 'bridge', réz 'copper', sajt 'cheese', tej 'milk', tíz 'ten', zöld 'green'
Turkic	hattyú 'swan', szó 'word', hód 'beaver'	homok 'sand', harang 'bell', ér 'worth sth'
Permic		agyar 'fang', daru 'crane', hagyma 'bulb'

In the era of the Turkic influences, Hungarians developed especially culturally: the borrowed vocabulary consists of terms referring to sophisticated dressing, and the words of a learned upper class society. The phrases of basic literacy are also of Turkic origin. A number of words related to agriculture and viticulture have the same background.

==== Phonetics ====
===== Vowels =====
Hungarian	Finnish	Translation
hal	kala	fish
kő; köv-	kivi	stone
lúd	lintu	hu: goose, fi: bird
kéz	käsi	hand

The phonetic system of Hungarian went through large changes in the Old Hungarian period. The most important change was the disappearance of the original Uralic word-ending vowels, which eroded in many descendant languages (among others Finnish, however, largely preserves these sounds; see the table on the right). Even so, declined forms of the nouns and inflected verbs of Uralic origin still show traces of the lost sounds: ló (horse)—lovas (rider); kő (stone)—köves (stony). This was the process of phonetic reduction. The earliest written records of Hungarian from the 9th century still show some retained word-final vowels, e.g. in hodu 'army' > modern had.

Possibly there had been also present a velar ï sound as well, later replaced by a palatal i. Today, since Hungarian has vowel harmony, some words containing the palatal sound i pick up the back suffix when conjugated or declined—instead of the front suffix, which is usual for i's of other origin. Some examples: nyíl (arrow) → nyilat (accusative; instead of *nyilet); inni ([v inf], to drink) → ivás (drinking [n], instead of *ivés).

The transition from diphthongs to simple vowels had already begun in the Proto-Hungarian period.

===== Consonants =====
Plosives between vowels developed to spirants, and those after nasal stops became voiced:

Original Uralic		Replaced by		Position
p	→	f	(voiceless labiodental fricative)	initial
p	→	β	(voiced bilabial fricative)	medial
t	→	z	(voiced alveolar fricative)	medial
k	→	x	(voiceless velar fricative)	in initial position in words that contain only velar vowels
k	→	ɣ	(voiced velar fricative)	medial
mp	→	b	(voiced bilabial stop)	everywhere
nt	→	d	(voiced alveolar stop)	everywhere
ŋk	→	ɡ	(voiced velar stop)	everywhere

==== Grammar ====
The language developed its interesting features, the transitive and intransitive verb conjugations. (See Hungarian grammar (verbs).) Marked possessive relations appeared. The accusative marker -t was developed, as well as many verb tenses.

== Old Hungarian (10th to 15th centuries) ==
Old Hungarian
- Region: Medieval Hungary
- Extinct: developed into Middle Hungarian by the 16th century
- Language family: Uralic: Finno-Ugric; Ugric; Old Hungarian

Language codes
- ISO 639-3: ohu
- Glottolog: oldh1242

By the 10th century, the Hungarians had established a principality in present-day Hungary and its neighbourhood. In 1000, Vajk — the later Stephen I of Hungary — got his crown from the Patriarch of the West, and the history of the Christian Kingdom of Hungary began.

In the 1490s, Hungarian was spoken by about 3.2 million people; this number was fairly high at the time. The first examples of official and legal use are dated back to these years. Some personal letters and wills are known. Nevertheless, the Ottoman Empire put pressure on neighbouring nations, just like on Hungary — the latter was unstable at the time, due to internal lordship disputes. This led to the Hungarian (led by Louis II of Hungary) loss of the Battle of Mohács (1526). In 1541, Ottomans finally captured the capital, Buda as well. The country was split into three parts; the southern regions fell under Ottoman rule; the western parts officially remained "Kingdom of Hungary", with Habsburg kings; and the eastern area, mainly Transylvania and the Partium became independent. Historical linguists set the end of the Old Hungarian period at 1526, as it is such an important date in Hungarian history.

=== Literary records ===
The Latin language was made official in the country—especially in the 11th to 15th centuries, the language of literature and religion was Latin. However, Hungarian was used in certain cases; sometimes it was fitted into Latin documents, to avoid later disputes about proprietary rights.

However, the first official document of Hungary is not in Latin, but in Greek—this is the "Charter of the nuns of Veszprémvölgy", dated to 997. The text contains some Hungarian (and also some Slavic) place names: e.g. saɣarbrien (compound formed from saɣar 'shaft' + an obsolete Turkic loanword, brien 'coalition'—today Szárberény); saːmtaɣ 'plough'; meleɡdi (from meleg 'warm' + -di diminutive suffix).

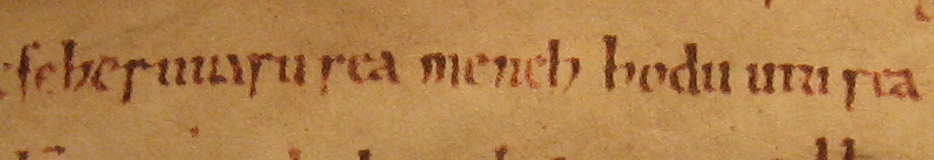
Hungarian words in the founding declaration of the Benedictine Abbey of Tihany, 1055

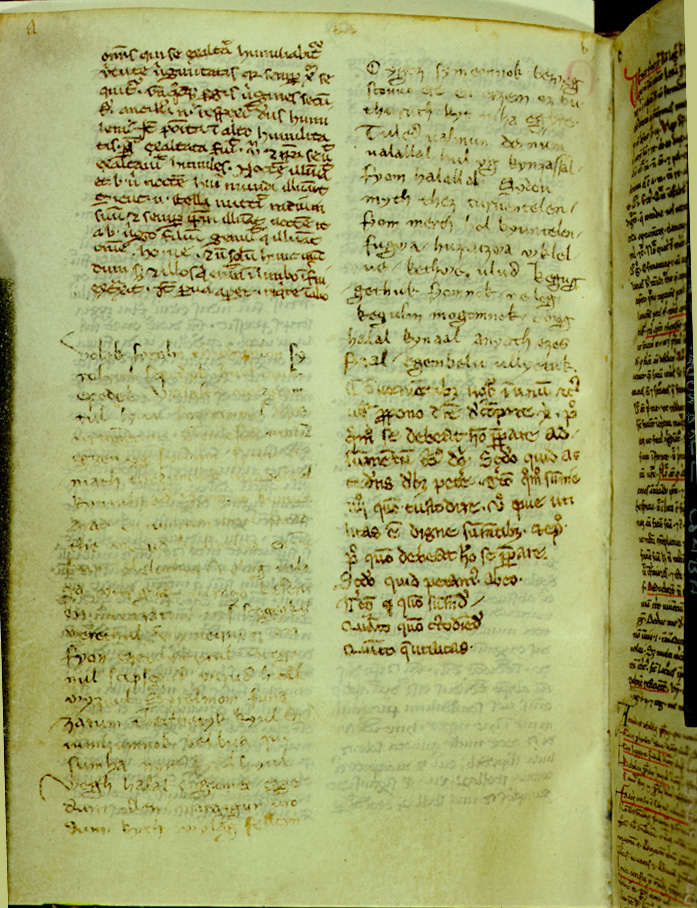
The Old Hungarian poem "Laments of Mary"

The next most important document is the "Establishing charter of the abbey of Tihany", dated to 1055. In the Latin text, 3 Hungarian sentences, 58 words, and 33 suffixes are present. The longest sentence is, in the original spelling, feheruuaru rea meneh hodu utu rea (reconstructed pronunciation: /fɛhɛːrvaːru reaː mɛnɛɣ hɔdu utu reaː/; modern Hungarian: "Fehérvárra menő hadi útra"—the postposition "rea", meaning "onto", became the suffix "-ra/-re"—English: 'up to the military road going to Fehérvár'). Today, the vellum is kept in the abbey of Pannonhalma.

Skipping intermediate Hungarian relics, the next important item is the "Funeral Sermon and Prayer" from 1192. This is the first text completely in Hungarian. The document is found on the 154th page of the Codex Pray (Pray here is not an English word but a name).

Hungarian

Latiatuc feleym zumtuchel mic vogmuc. yſa pur eſ chomuv uogmuc. Menyi miloſtben terumteve eleve miv iſemucut adamut. eſ odutta vola neki paradiſumut hazoa. Eſ mend paradiſumben uolov gimilcictul munda neki elnie. Heon tilutoa wt ig fa gimilce tvl. Ge mundoa neki meret nu eneyc. yſa ki nopun emdul oz gimilſtwl. halalnec halalaal holz. Hadlaua choltat terumteve iſtentul. ge feledeve. Engede urdung intetvinec. eſ evec oz tiluvt gimilſtwl. es oz gimilſben halalut evec. Eſ oz gimilſnek vvl keſeruv uola vize. hug turchucat mige zocoztia vola. Num heon muga nec. ge mend w foianec halalut evec. Horogu vec iſten. eſ veteve wt ez munkaſ vilagbele. eſ levn halalnec eſ poculnec feze. eſ mend w nemenec. Kic ozvc. miv vogmuc.

English

Ye see, my brethren, with your eyes, what we are! Behold, we are dust and ashes. Through His divine grace the Lord God first made our ancestor, Adam, and gave him the Paradise of Eden for his home. And of all the fruits of Paradise, He bade him live, forbidding to him only the fruit of one tree, yet telling him, why he should not eat of it: "Lo, on the day thou eatest of this fruit, thou shalt die the death of deaths." Adam had heard of his death from his Creator-God, yet he forgot. He yielded to the Devil's allurement, and ate of the forbidden fruit, and in that fruit he partook of death. And so bitter was the juice of that fruit, it (almost?) burst their throats. Not only for himself, but for all his race he ate death. In anger, God cast him into this world of toil, and he became the nest of death and damnation, for all his kind. Who shalt be those? We are them.

—Quoted from the Funeral Sermon and Prayer, 1192.

Literature in Hungarian is counted since the previous writing. The first known Hungarian poem has the title 'Laments of Mary'—its theme is the story of Jesus' crucifixion, from the viewpoint of Mary. It was denoted around 1300, but possibly it is not the first version. Its text is clear, easy to understand and logical, free of latinisms. The first verse:

Hungarian

Volek ſyrolm thudothlon
ſy rolmol ſepedyk.
buol oʒuk epedek ··

Pronunciation

vɔlɛːk ʃirɔlm tudɔtlɔn
ʃirɔlmol ʃɛpɛdik
buol ɔsuk, ɛpedɛk

English

I was lament-ignorant;
I am suffering from lament,
I am suffering, languishing from sorrow.

The next important relic—with a cheerless history—is the "Fragment of Königsberg", dated approximately to the 1350s. This is the remains of the first known, explicitly proven Hungarian book. The codex had arrived at Wrocław, Poland, by the end of the century; there, because it was not understandable to the Polish bookbinder, it was chopped and used to bind a Latin book. The other important book from the time is the Codex Jókay; a 15th-century copy of an original from 1372. The codex is about the life of Francis of Assisi.

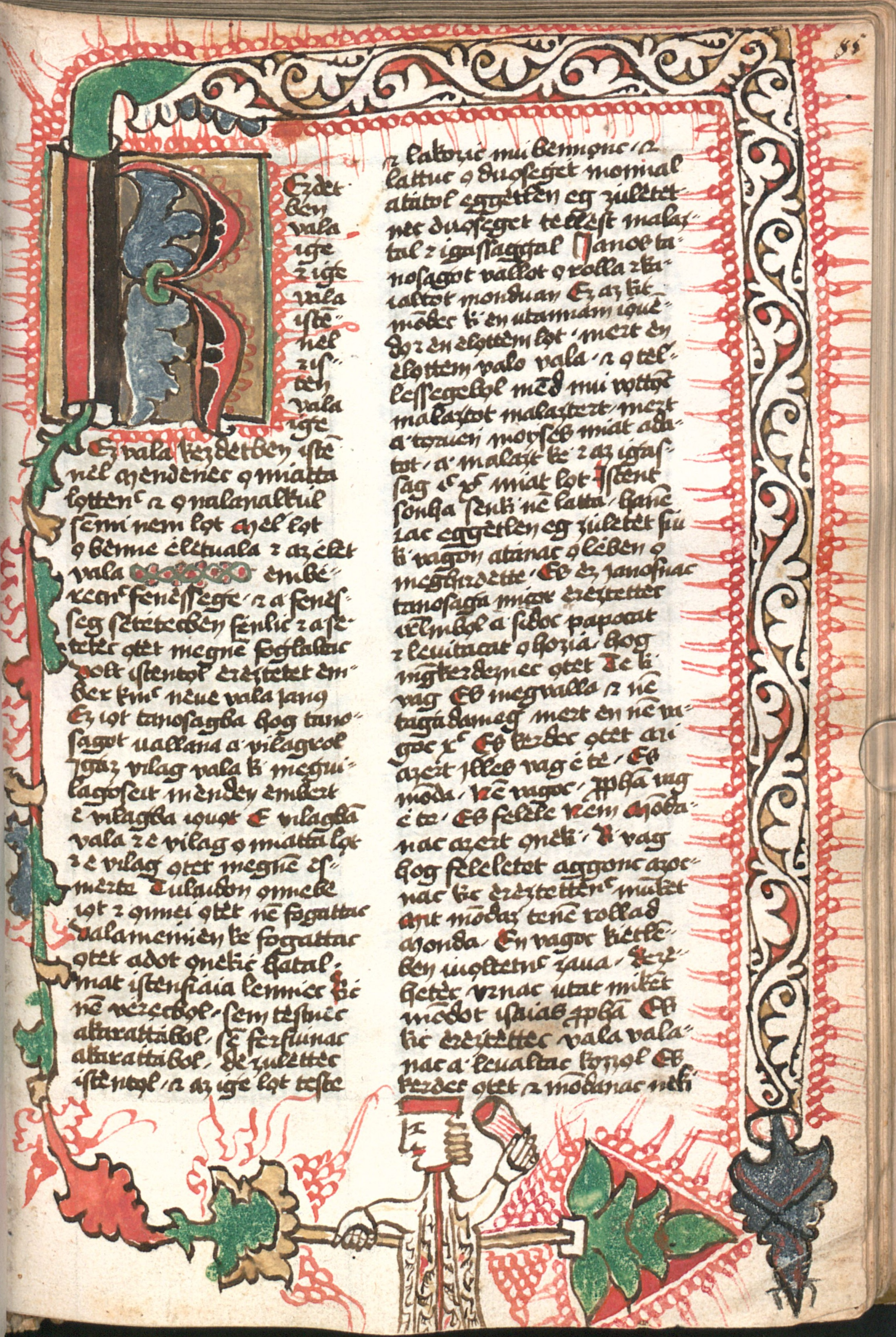
A copy of the Hussite Bible, in the Codex of Munich, dated to 1466

In the early 15th century, some non-comprehensive Latin-Hungarian dictionaries, or rather word lists, were composed. Some shorter texts are also known. The most important work is however the first translation of the Bible: the Hussite Bible, dated to 1416. The Bible was translated by priests Tamás Pécsi and Bálint Ujlaki. They were affected by the concepts of Jan Hus during their university years (1399–1411) in Prague. The Inquisition pursued Hussitism, and the translation was confiscated from the translators; regardless it became so popular that several authentic copies of the original survive.

More and more Hungarian books were written, most of them religious. Over and above the "Laments of Mary", the other important item of Old Hungarian poetry is Szabács viadala ("Triumph of Šabac"). Reputedly, it was denoted in the year of the battle (1476); in this, Hungarian troops led by King Matthias of Hungary had a glorious victory over the Ottoman army — its issue is secular. It is possibly a fragment of a longer poem. A quotation:

Hungarian

De aʒ fellywl mōdot pal keneʒÿ Aroknak melyſeget ygen neʒÿ kÿ Sabach erws voltat elmelle Honneg mÿnemw algÿw kel melle

Pronunciation

dɛ ɑz feʎːøːl mondot paːl keneʒi
aːroknɑk meːʎʃeːɡeːt iɡen nezi
ki ʃɑbatʃ erøːʃ voltaːt ɛlmeːlːeː
honːeːɡ minemøː aːlɟuː kel mɛlːeː

English

But, Pál Kinizsi said about the thing,
who was regarding the dike's depth;
who knew the powerfulness of Šabac:
what sort of cannons should be brought from where.

Some Old Hungarian script inscriptions are also known, such as the "Alphabet of Nikolsburg" (1483) and a number of deciphered and undeciphered inscriptions.

=== Linguistic changes ===
==== Vocabulary ====
In this period, Hungarian developed several new words. One way this happened was through loanwords coming from languages whose speakers mediated the new concepts. On the other hand, internal word formation also took place, in which the words for new concepts were derived from earlier words.

Compared to Modern Hungarian, Old Hungarian was rich in derivative suffixes. Most of these suffixes are also derived from other suffixes, so they can be aligned in "suffix-bushes". There were numerous diminutive suffixes, non-productive in today's Hungarian, e.g. -d ("holmod", from "holom"—"tiny hill"); -t (it left its trace in some geographic names); -n, -ny, -m (as in kicsiny, from kicsi—very little).

Forming compounds was also a way to coin new terms.

But then again, there are several loanwords dating back to the period 896–1526. Loans were mainly acquired from Slavic languages (for example, kiraːʎ 'king'), German (e. g. hɛrtsɛɡ 'prince'), and Latin (e. g., tɛmplom 'church'). As emerges from the previous examples, these words are primarily associated with Christianity and politics. Other loans are the names of animals living outside Hungary, terms of technology, and so on.

==== Grammar ====
Verbs

Like English, Modern Hungarian has two verb tenses: past and nonpast. Futurity is expressed using the auxiliary verb foɡ. However, Old Hungarian had six verb tenses: Past Narrative (Latin: praeteritum), Past Finite, Past Complex, Present, Future Simple, and Future Complex.

Past Narrative was marked using the suffixes -é, -á in transitive and -e, -a in intransitive. The tense was used to describe an array of past events originally. The verb várni 'to wait' conjugated in this tense:

Past Narrative – várni
Number	Person	Type	
Number	Person	Transitive	Intransitive
Singular	1st (I)	várám	várék
Singular	2nd (You)	várád	várál
Singular	3rd (He/She)	várá	vára
Plural	1st (We)	várók	váránk
Plural	2nd (You)	várátok	várátok
Plural	3rd (They)	várák	várának

Future simple was expressed using the suffix -nd. Future complex (the present-day future tense of the language) is conjugated in the following way:

Infinitive + auxiliary verb 'fog'
menni fog—he/she is going to go

== Middle Hungarian ==
The first printed book written in Hungarian was published in Kraków in 1533, by Benedek Komjáti. The work's title is Az Szent Pál levelei magyar nyelven (In original spelling: Az zenth Paal leueley magyar nyeluen), i.e. The letters of Saint Paul in the Hungarian language. In the 17th century, the language was already very similar to its present-day form, although two of the past tenses were still used. German, Italian and French loans also appeared in the language by these years. Further Turkish words were borrowed during the Ottoman occupation of much of Hungary between 1541 and 1699.

=== Linguistic changes ===
The vowel system of Hungarian had developed roughly to its current shape by the 16th century. At its fullest the system included eight phonemes occurring both short and long:

	Front		Back
	Illabial	Labial	Back
Close	i,iː	y,yː	u,uː
Mid	e,eː	ø,øː	o,oː
Open / Open-mid	ɛ,ɛː		ɔ,aː

This largely symmetric system was complicated only by the presence of open illabial /aː/ as the long counterpart of short /ɔ/. In modern Hungarian this is mainly found as a front vowel.

The contrasts between mid /e/ and open-mid /ɛ/ (including their long counterparts) have later been mostly lost. The shift /ɛː/ > /eː/ took place widely during the 16th and 17th centuries, across most of the Hungarian-speaking area. In several dialects this however did not lead to a merger; in response, /eː/ may have been either raised to /iː/, or (in northeastern dialects) diphthongized to /ie/. The shift /e/ > /ɛ/ also arose equally early in the central dialects underlying Standard Hungarian. Its spread to the other Hungarian dialects has however been much slower.

== Modern Hungarian ==
In the late 18th century, the language was incapable of clearly expressing new scientific concepts, and several writers found the vocabulary a bit scant for literary purposes. Thus, a group of writers, most notably Ferenc Kazinczy, began to compensate for these imperfections. Some words were shortened (győzedelem > győzelem, 'triumph' or 'victory'); a number of dialectal words spread nationally (e. g. cselleng 'dawdle'); extinct words were reintroduced (dísz 'décor'); a wide range of expressions were coined using the various derivative suffixes; and some other, less frequently used methods of expanding the language were utilized. This movement was called the 'language reform' (Hungarian: nyelvújítás, lit. "language renewal"), and produced more than ten thousand words, many of which remain in active use today. The reforms contributed to the installment of Hungarian as the official language over Latin in the country in 1844. The Csángó Hungarians did not take part in the language reforms of the Age of Enlightenment, so their dialect is the most archaic form of Hungarian.

The 19th and 20th centuries saw further standardization of the language, and differences between the already mutually comprehensible dialects gradually lessened. In 1920, due to the Treaty of Trianon, Hungary lost 71% of its territories, along with these, 33% of the ethnic Hungarian population. Today, the language is official in Hungary, and regionally also in Romania, Slovakia, and Serbia.

== See also ==
- Hungarian language
- Regular sound correspondences between Hungarian and other Uralic languages
- Hungarian dialects
- Hungarian literature
- Funeral Sermon and Prayer
- Old Hungarian 'Lamentations of Mary'
- History of Hungary
- Alternative theories of Hungarian language origins

== Reference works ==
- Balázs, Géza: The Story of Hungarian. A Guide to the Language. Transl. by Thomas J. DeKornfeld. Budapest: Corvina Publishing, 1997. ISBN 9631343626
- Berta, Arpád & Róna-Tas, András: West Old Turkic: Turkic Loanwords in Hungarian (Turcologica 84). Wiesbaden: Harrassowitz, 2011.
- Kálmán, Béla: Hungarian historical phonology. Budapest: Akadémiai Kiadó, 1972.
- Molnár, József—Simon, Györgyi: Magyar nyelvemlékek. 3rd edition, Budapest: Tankönyvkiadó, 1980. ISBN 9631747387
- Dr. Inczefi, Géza: A magyar nyelv fejlődéstörténete. Typescript. Budapest: Tankönyvkiadó, 1969.
- Heltai, Gáspár: Száz fabvla. Kolozsvár: Heltai Press, 1566.
- Lakó, György: Proto-Finno-Ugric sources of the Hungarian phonetic stock (Uralic and Altaic series 80). Indiana University Press, 1968.
- A magyar középkor története. Pannonica, 2006.
- Papp, István: Unkarin kielen historia (Tietolipas 54). Helsinki: Suomalaisen Kirjallisuuden Seura, 1968. OCLC 23570356 ISBN 978-951-717-012-3
- Ruffy, Péter: Bujdosó nyelvemlékeink. Budapest: Móra Publishing, 1977.
