= Otto Győr =

Hungarian noble

Palatine of Hungary
- Reign: 1066
- Predecessor: Rado
- Successor: Rodowan
- Died: after 1066
- Noble family: gens Győr
- Spouse: unidentified (fl. 1061)
- Issue: Alexius (adopted)
- Father: Győr

Otto (Atha) from the kindred Győr (Hungarian: Győr nembeli Ottó or Atha; died after 1066) was a Hungarian noble in the second half of the 11th century, who served as palatine (Latin: palatinus) in 1066, during the reign of Solomon, King of Hungary. He was the ancestor of the gens Győr, which flourished until the 17th century.

== Family ==
Coat-of-arms of the gens Győr

Medieval chronicles unanimously considered the Győr (also Geur or Jeur) kindred originated from Germany, who came to the Kingdom of Hungary in the first half of the 11th century. The fourteenth-century chronicle composition (Illuminated Chronicle) does not refer to the clan, when describes the circumstances of the foundation of the Zselicszentjakab Abbey by family member Otto in 1061. Majority of the historians – for instance, György Györffy, Gyula Kristó and Erik Fügedi accepted the theory of German origin. Györffy wrote the clan arrived to the kingdom at the beginning of the reign of Stephen I, the first king of Hungary. He considered the ancestor of the kindred was German knight Győr, who participated in the defeat of Koppány alongside other foreign warriors, and settled down in Western Hungary after receiving royal land donations. Consequently, the county and the diocese were named after him. Historian Erik Fügedi claimed the kindred came to the Kingdom of Hungary during the reign of Andrew I (r. 1046–1060) and also accepted the individual Győr as the founder of the clan. Gyula Kristó accepted the narration of the Illuminated Chronicle, which says Poth (also Pot or Pat) arrived to Hungary during Solomon's rule (1063–1074), but he does not connect him to the Győr kindred; he argues its first member was Otto. Other historians – e.g. János Karácsonyi and Elemér Mályusz – refused to accept the kindred's claimed German ancestry; late 19th-century genealogist János Karácsonyi did not consider Otto as a member of the clan.

It is plausible that Otto was the son of the knight Győr. According to the establishing charter of the Zselicszentjakab Abbey, Otto excluded his kinship from inheritance of the monastery and entrusted the decision to the king. The terms "cognatus" and "nepos" reflects to distant relatives, but other line mentions a certain Alexius, who might be the (adopted) son of Otto. The document was interpolated by numerous occasions in the following centuries; a note from 1257 claimed that Otto was the son of Győr, which perhaps reflected the interests of the Győr kindred, who were patrons of the Zselicszentjakab Abbey by then. Nevertheless, the narration of the deed confirms that Otto's father (Győr?) had multiple siblings and/or children. Historian Norbert C. Tóth tried to bring the 1061 charter in line with the traditions preserved by the medieval chronicles: he argued Győr was the brother of Pat (or Pot), ancestor of the more illustrious Győr-Moson (or Óvár) branch, while Otto was a member of the so-called Somogy branch (Szenterzsébet, Szentadorján, Szerdahely and Csécsény sub-branches), which initially remained insignificant in the 13th century, but later the Szerdahely branch reached its peak. Tóth considers Pat had also at least two sons (Otto's cousins) based on the location and separation of estates in Transdanubia.

== Career ==
On their return, Count Palatine Atha [Otto] requested the king [Solomon] and the duke [Géza] that they should be present at the consecration of his monastery which he had built at Zselic in honor of St. James; and this was done.

— Illuminated Chronicle

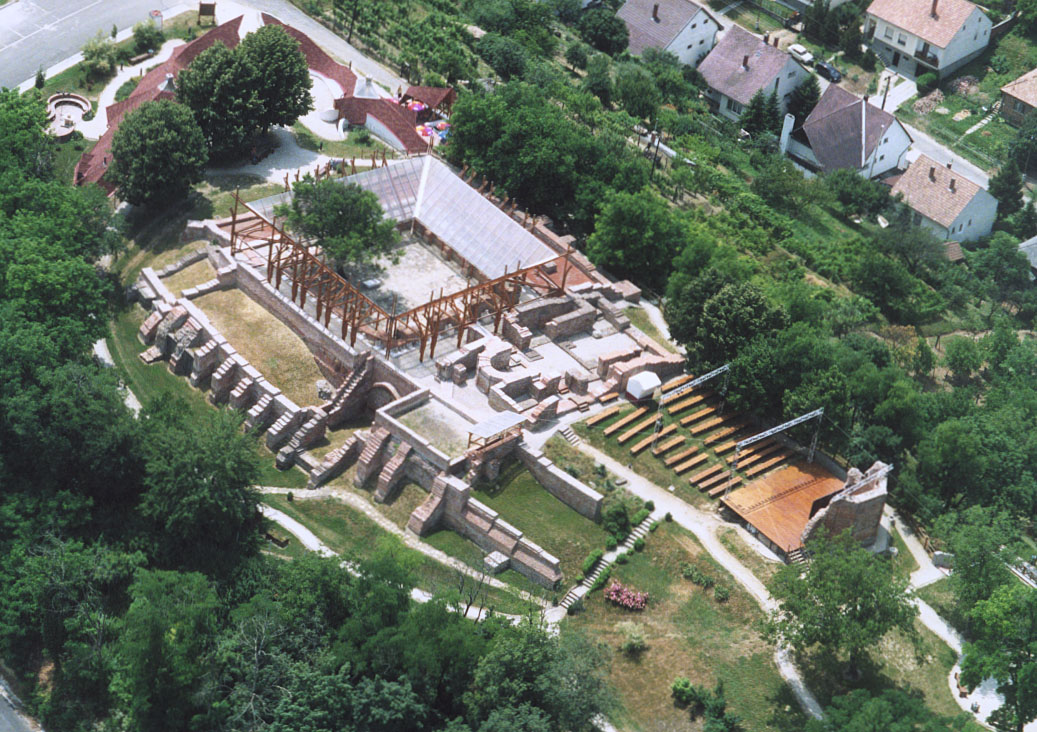
Ruins of Zselicszentjakab Abbey in present-day Kaposszentjakab

Otto functioned as ispán (Latin: comes) of Somogy County in 1061. During that time he founded the Zselicszentjakab Abbey, a Benedictine monastery at Kaposszentjakab in Somogy County. The monastery was dedicated to the Apostle Saint James the Great. The deed of the foundation of the monastery – drafted by George, Bishop of Veszprém – is the first extant charter issued by a nobleman in the Kingdom of Hungary. During the process, Otto handed over his landholdings, villages and manors with altogether 360 local resident servants, located in Somogy County, to the Benedictine abbey; prior to that he was granted these estates possibly by King Andrew I. György Györffy emphasized the territory once belonged to the late pretender Koppány. The Győr clan's inherited possessions in Győr County remained intact, except Tényő, of which Otto donated to the monastery too.

Both King Solomon, whom Otto supported, and Duke Géza were, in 1065 or 1066, present at the consecration. Both of them were returned from the war against the Duchy of Carinthia. As an influential confidant of Solomon, Otto was made Palatine of Hungary by that time. There are also arguments that the consecration, and consequently Otto's term as palatine took place in either 1064, 1067 or 1068. Historian Bernát Kumorovitz, who re-discovered Otto's charter from 1061, argued the event occurred in 1066, based on the research of József Gerics, who considered this paragraph is the last section of the so-called Urgesta (Hungarian: ősgeszta), the first hypothetical Hungarian chronicle, later utilized by the 14th-century Illuminated Chronicle.

Otto had no legitimate son, but took care of his wife and adopted child Alexius. However he excluded them from inheritance of the monastery and entrusted the decision to the king. Later, the patron of the Zselicszentjakab Abbey was the Szentgyörgyi family.

== Sources ==
- Berend, Nora; Laszlovszky, József; Szakács, Béla Zsolt (2007). "The kingdom of Hungary". In Berend, Nora (ed.). Christianization and the Rise of Christian Monarchy: Scandinavia, Central Europe and Rus', c.900-1200. Cambridge University Press. pp. 319–368. ISBN 978-0-521-87616-2.
- C. Tóth, Norbert (2001). "A Győr-nemzetség az Árpád-korban [The Győr Kindred in the Age of Árpáds]". In Neumann, Tibor (ed.). Analecta Mediaevalia I. Tanulmányok a középkorról (in Hungarian). Argumentum Kiadó. pp. 53–72. ISBN 963-446-174-3.
- Csóka, Gáspár (1994). "Zselicszentjakab". In Kristó, Gyula; Engel, Pál; Makk, Ferenc (eds.). Korai magyar történeti lexikon (9-14. század) [Encyclopedia of the Early Hungarian History (9th-14th centuries)] (in Hungarian). Akadémiai Kiadó. p. 749. ISBN 963-05-6722-9.
- Engel, Pál (2001). The Realm of St Stephen: A History of Medieval Hungary, 895–1526. I.B. Tauris Publishers. ISBN 1-86064-061-3.
- Györffy, György (2013). István király és műve [King Stephen and his work] (in Hungarian). Balassi Kiadó. ISBN 978-963-506-896-8.
- Kumorovitz, L. Bernát (1964). "A zselicszentjakabi alapítólevél 1061-ből : "Pest" legkorábbi említése [The Deed of the Foundation of the Zselicszentjakab Abbey From 1061: The Earliest Mention of "Pest"]". Tanulmányok Budapest Múltjából 16. Akadémiai Kiadó. pp. 43–83.
- Markó, László (2006). A magyar állam főméltóságai Szent Istvántól napjainkig: Életrajzi Lexikon [Great Officers of State in Hungary from King Saint Stephen to Our Days: A Biographical Encyclopedia] (in Hungarian). Helikon Kiadó. ISBN 963-208-970-7.
- Varga, Virág (2019). "A Győr nemzetség az oligarchia időszakában [The Győr Kindred during the Era of Oligarchy]". Első Század (in Hungarian). 20 (Autumn): 79–101. ISSN 2063-5737.
- Zsoldos, Attila (2011). Magyarország világi archontológiája, 1000–1301 [Secular Archontology of Hungary, 1000–1301] (in Hungarian). História, MTA Történettudományi Intézete. ISBN 978-963-9627-38-3.

Otto Genus Győr Born: ? Died: after 1066
Political offices
| Preceded by first known | Ispán of Somogy; 1061 | Succeeded by Grab |
| Preceded by Rado | Palatine of Hungary; 1066 | Succeeded by Rodowan |
