= Andrew (bishop of Veszprém) =

Hungarian bishop

- Bishop of Veszprém
- Installed: c. 1062
- Term ended: c. 1081
- Predecessor: George (?)
- Successor: John (?)

Personal details
- Denomination: Roman Catholic

Andrew (Hungarian: András) was a Hungarian prelate in the 11th century, who served as Bishop of Veszprém sometime between 1062 and 1081. His life and activities are unknown, his name is only preserved by several settlement and geographical names throughout in the region on the north shore of Lake Balaton in the territory of the diocese.

== Presence in sources ==
His name is not appeared in chronicles nor list of dignitaries of contemporary diplomas. A land register of the Bakonybél Abbey from 1086 mentions Andrew donated one of the estates ("villa Andree episcopi") to the monastery prior to that. Archaeologist Endre Tóth identified this village with Endréd (Endre is an old Hungarian name variant of Andrew or András), present-day an uninhabited borough of Magyarpolány. Additionally, Andrew donated a portion in Földvár to the abbey. The nearby Balatonendréd – an estate of the cathedral chapter of Veszprém – also preserved the bishop's name. Plausibly he donated the land to the chapter. Andrew also possessed a lime kiln and a landholding named Endréd near the villages Márkó, Szentgál and Bánd.

Endre Tóth argued Andrew served as Bishop of Veszprém in the period between 1062 and 1081 (or 1079). A certain George is widely considered a bishop of Veszprém in 1061. Tóth claimed the first St. Michael's Cathedral in Veszprém was most probably built during Andrew's episcopate.

== Sources ==
- Tóth, Endre (2021). "Egy ismeretlen 11. századi veszprémi püspök: András [An Unknown Bishop of Veszprém in the 11th Century: Andreas]". In Karlinszky, Balázs; Varga, Tibor László (eds.). "Capella reginalis". A veszprémi püspökség a középkorban (A veszprémi egyházmegye múltjából 38.) (in Hungarian). Veszprémi Főegyházmegyei Levéltár. pp. 9–25. ISBN 978-615-81349-6-5.
- Zsoldos, Attila (2011). Magyarország világi archontológiája, 1000–1301 [Secular Archontology of Hungary, 1000–1301] (in Hungarian). História, MTA Történettudományi Intézete. ISBN 978-963-9627-38-3.

Catholic Church titles
Preceded by George (?)	Bishop of Veszprém c. 1062–1081	Succeeded by John (?)
