= Zache =

Palatine of Hungary
- Reign: c. 1055
- Predecessor: Samuel Aba
- Successor: Rado
- Died: after 1055

Zache or Zacha (died after 1055) was a noble in the Kingdom of Hungary, who served as palatine (Latin: comes palatii) around 1055, during the reign of Andrew I of Hungary. His name was mentioned in the establishing charter of the abbey of Tihany.

== Sources ==
- (in Hungarian) Markó, László (2006). A magyar állam főméltóságai Szent Istvántól napjainkig – Életrajzi Lexikon ("The High Officers of the Hungarian State from Saint Stephen to the Present Days – A Biographical Encyclopedia") (2nd edition); Helikon Kiadó Kft., Budapest; ISBN 963-547-085-1.
- (in Hungarian) Zsoldos, Attila (2011). Magyarország világi archontológiája, 1000–1301 ("Secular Archontology of Hungary, 1000–1301"). História, MTA Történettudományi Intézete. Budapest. ISBN 978-963-9627-38-3

Political offices
Preceded by Samuel Aba	Palatine of Hungary c. 1055	Succeeded by Rado
