= George (bishop of Veszprém) =

Hungarian bishop

- Bishop of Veszprém
- Installed: 1055/1061
- Term ended: after 1061
- Predecessor: Nicholas
- Successor: Andrew (?)

Personal details
- Died: after 1061
- Denomination: Roman Catholic

George (Hungarian: György) was a Hungarian prelate in the 11th century, who served as Bishop of Veszprém around 1061.

== Bishop of Veszprém ==
George contributed to the foundation of Zselicszentjakab Abbey in 1061, when he already served as bishop. George formulated and drafted the establishing charter of the Benedictine monastery. Therefore, the prelate was granted a portion in the village Dorog in Somogy County with a vineyard and servants (present-day a borough of Patosfa) by ispán Otto Győr, the founder of Zselicszentjakab Abbey.

According to historian Bernát Kumorovitz, George edited the establishing charter based on a diploma of foreign origin, where he included the intent of the founder regarding the portion in Dorog alongside the donations to the newly established monastery. Kumorovitz considered George studied at a university in Western Europe or originated from there, since the wording of the diploma is very similar to the style of the private charters from the Carolingian period.

The establishing charter itself do not refer to Bishop George's episcopal see. Kumorovitz argued as he acted as testimony and drafter (testis et scriptor) during the foundation of Zselicszentjakab Abbey, he must have been the incumbent Bishop of Veszprém, as the monastery laid in the territory of that diocese, whose construction and consecration required the permission of the local bishop. Additionally, The monastery was built on the hill in honor of the Apostle St. James on a hill along the Kapos River, on the basics of a former ecclesiastical institution under episcopal jurisdiction. George's role in the establishment proves that Somogy County belonged to the jurisdiction of the Diocese of Veszprém in the 11th century, instead of the suzerainty of the Pannonhalma Abbey.

Accordingly, George was installed Bishop of Veszprém sometime after 1055, when his predecessor Nicholas (or Clement) is mentioned in the establishing charter of the abbey of Tihany. The next known bishop is John, according to a non-authentic charter with the date 1082. Archaeologist Endre Tóth considered – based on geographical names in the territory of the diocese – there was a bishop called Andrew, who served in this capacity sometime between 1062 and 1079 (or 1081).

== Sources ==
- Kumorovitz, L. Bernát (1964). "A zselicszentjakabi alapítólevél 1061-ből : "Pest" legkorábbi említése [The Deed of the Foundation of the Zselicszentjakab Abbey From 1061: The Earliest Mention of "Pest"]". Tanulmányok Budapest Múltjából 16. Akadémiai Kiadó. pp. 43–83.
- Solymosi, László (1999). "Püspöki joghatóság Somogyban a XI. században [Episcopal Jurisdiction in Somogy in the 11th Century]". Turul (in Hungarian). 72 (3–4). Magyar Heraldikai és Genealógiai Társaság: 100–107. ISSN 1216-7258.
- Tóth, Endre (2021). "Egy ismeretlen 11. századi veszprémi püspök: András [An Unknown Bishop of Veszprém in the 11th Century: Andreas]". In Karlinszky, Balázs; Varga, Tibor László (eds.). "Capella reginalis". A veszprémi püspökség a középkorban (A veszprémi egyházmegye múltjából 38.) (in Hungarian). Veszprémi Főegyházmegyei Levéltár. pp. 9–25. ISBN 978-615-81349-6-5.
- Zsoldos, Attila (2011). Magyarország világi archontológiája, 1000–1301 [Secular Archontology of Hungary, 1000–1301] (in Hungarian). História, MTA Történettudományi Intézete. ISBN 978-963-9627-38-3.

Catholic Church titles
Preceded by Nicholas	Bishop of Veszprém c. 1061	Succeeded by Andrew (?)
