= Zselicszentjakab Abbey =

Benedictine monastery in Hungary

Coordinates: 46°21′29″N 17°50′43″E

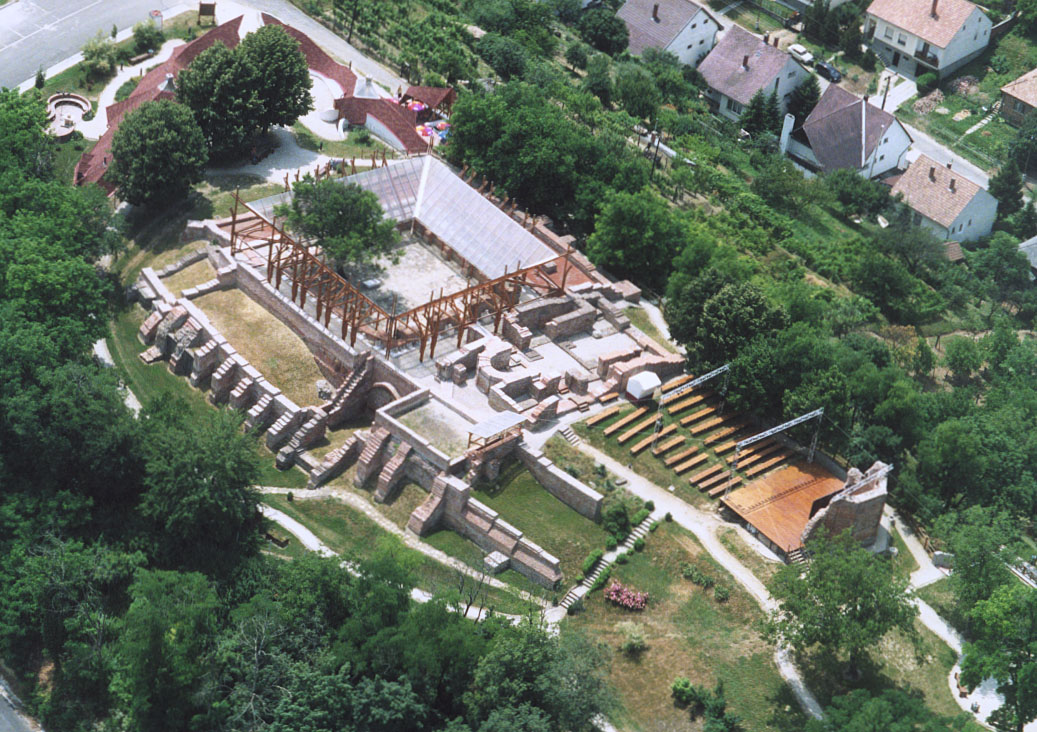

The Zselicszentjakab Abbey was a Benedictine monastery established at Zselicszentjakab (now Kaposszentjakab) in Somogy County in the Kingdom of Hungary in 1061. Its founder was the Palatine Otto of the Győr clan. The monastery was dedicated to the Apostle Saint James the Great. The deed of the foundation of the monastery – drafted by George, Bishop of Veszprém – is the first extant charter issued by a nobleman in the Kingdom of Hungary.

== Sources ==
- Berend, Nora; Laszlovszky, József; Szakács, Béla Zsolt (2007). "The kingdom of Hungary". In Berend, Nora (ed.). Christianization and the Rise of Christian Monarchy: Scandinavia, Central Europe and Rus', c.900-1200. Cambridge University Press. pp. 319–368. ISBN 978-0-521-87616-2.
- Engel, Pál (2001). The Realm of St Stephen: A History of Medieval Hungary, 895–1526. I.B. Tauris Publishers. ISBN 1-86064-061-3.
- Csóka, Gáspár (1994). "Zselicszentjakab". In Kristó, Gyula; Engel, Pál; Makk, Ferenc (eds.). Korai magyar történeti lexikon (9-14. század) [Encyclopedia of the Early Hungarian History (9th-14th centuries)] (in Hungarian). Akadémiai Kiadó. p. 749. ISBN 963-05-6722-9.
