= Grab (ispán) =

Hungarian nobleman

Ispán of Somogy
- Reign: c. 1087–1090
- Predecessor: Otto Győr (1061)
- Successor: Theobald (1111–1113)
- Died: after 1094
- Noble family: gens Tibold
- Issue: Theobald (?)

Grab (Hungarian: Garáb; died after 1094), was a Hungarian nobleman in the late 11th century, who served as ispán of Somogy County around 1087–1090.

== Career ==
According to historian Mór Wertner, Grab was a member of the gens (clan) Tibold of German origin, which settled down in Hungary during the reign of Géza, Grand Prince of the Hungarians. Wertner considered that his name derived from the title "Graf".

Grab was an influential member of the court of King Ladislaus I of Hungary during the last years of the latter's reign. By the late 1080s, he was elevated into the position of ispán of Somogy County, where the majority of his clan's landholdings laid. Grab was present when Ladislaus I founded the Bishopric of Zagreb sometime between 1087 and 1090 (the Croatian historiography, however, put the date of the foundation to the year 1094, after Ladislaus' invasion of Croatia). It is possible that the newly founded diocese was granted lands and estates from the territory of Somogy County too (perhaps Dubrava forest, for instance), which indicates Grab's presence as the only ispán among the prelates and court officials during the act. The name of ispán Grab without seat appears in a non-authentic charter with the date 1093, which narrates a border dispute between the Archdiocese of Kalocsa and the Diocese of Pécs. The forgery was compiled, among others, by the usage of an authentic document from 1090, which assumes that Grab still held his post that year.

Around 1093 or 1094, Grab founded a Benedictine monastery in Garáb in Syrmia County (present-day Grabovo, Serbia), dedicated to Margaret the Virgin. Consequently, the settlement was named after him thereafter. It became one of the three family monasteries of the Tibold clan, beside the abbeys in Babócsa and Béla (today Bijela, Croatia). It is possible that Theobald, who served as ispán of Somogy County in c. 1111–1113, was the son of Grab.

== Sources ==
- F. Romhányi, Beatrix (2000). Kolostorok és társaskáptalanok a középkori Magyarországon: Katalógus [Monasteries and Collegiate Chapters in Medieval Hungary: A Catalogue] (in Hungarian). Pytheas. ISBN 963-7483-07-1.
- Koszta, László (2013). A kalocsai érseki tartomány kialakulása [The Development of the Archdiocese of Kalocsa] (in Hungarian). Pécsi Történettudományért Kulturális Egyesület. ISBN 978-963-89482-2-9.
- Magyar, Kálmán (2001). "Szent István király államszervezésének somogyi emlékeiről [The Memories of the State Organization of King Saint Stephen in Somogy County]". In Bertalan, Béla (ed.). Tabi Kilátó 2000–2001 (in Hungarian). Tab Város Polgármesteri Hivatal. pp. 27–48. ISSN 0237-580X.
- Szeberényi, Gábor (2017). "Zala és Somogy megye a Dráván túl. Megjegyzések a szlavóniai igazgatástörténet Árpád-kori rekonstrukciójának néhány kérdéséhez [Zala and Somogy counties beyond the river Drava. Remarks on some aspects of administration in Sclavonia during the Árpád age]". In Szanka, Brigitta; Szolnoki, Zoltán; Juhász, Péter (eds.). Középkortörténeti tanulmányok 9 (in Hungarian). University of Szeged. pp. 319–335. ISBN 978-963-315-347-5.
- Zsoldos, Attila (2011). Magyarország világi archontológiája, 1000–1301 [Secular Archontology of Hungary, 1000–1301] (in Hungarian). História, MTA Történettudományi Intézete. ISBN 978-963-9627-38-3.
