= Pray Codex =

Collection of medieval manuscripts

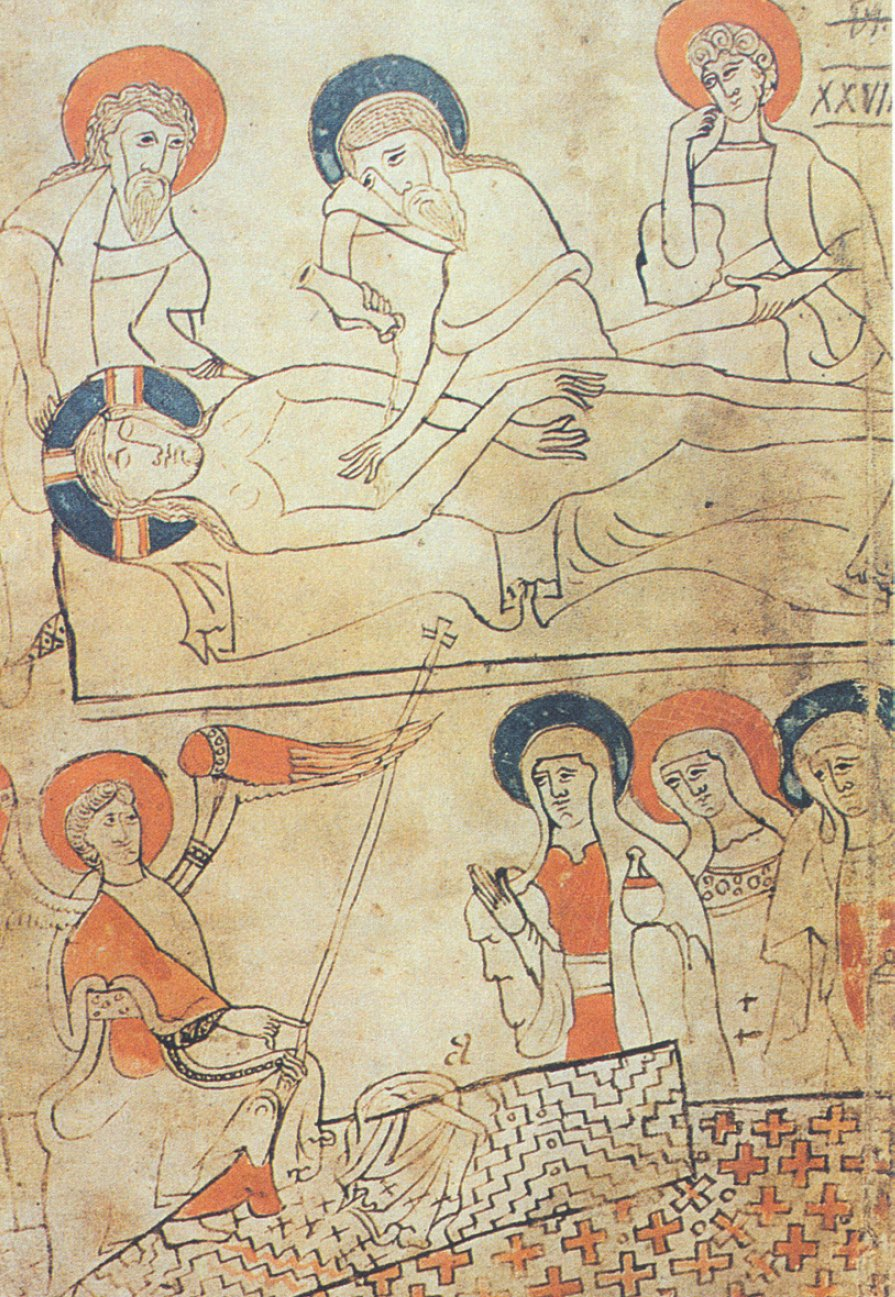
The Entombment of Christ (above) and Three Marys at the tomb (below). The images are claimed as one of the evidences against the radiocarbon 14 dating of the Shroud of Turin.

The Pray Codex, also called Codex Pray or The Hungarian Pray Manuscript, is a collection of medieval manuscripts, dated to the late 12th to early 13th centuries. In 1813 it was named after György Pray, who discovered it in 1770. It is the first known example of continuous prose text in Hungarian. The Codex is kept in the National Széchényi Library of Budapest.

One of the most well-known documents within the Codex (f. 154a) is the Funeral Sermon and Prayer (Hungarian: Halotti beszéd és könyörgés). It is an old handwritten Hungarian text dating to 1192-1195. The importance of the Funeral Sermon comes from its being the oldest surviving Hungarian, and Uralic, text.

The Codex also features a missal, an Easter mystery play, songs with musical notation, laws from the time of Coloman of Hungary and the Annales Posonienses, which list the Hungarian kings.

One of the five illustrations within the Codex shows the body of Jesus being prepared for burial, and also the subsequent Resurrection of Jesus, with an angel showing the empty tomb to the Three Ladies. This illustration shows generic similarities with the Shroud of Turin: Jesus is shown entirely naked with the arms on the pelvis, as in the body image of the Shroud of Turin; the thumbs on the image appear to be retracted, with only four fingers visible on each hand, matching the detail on the Turin Shroud; the supposed fabric shows a herringbone pattern, similar to the weaving pattern of the Shroud; and the four tiny circles on the lower image, which appear to form a letter L, "perfectly reproduce four apparent "poker holes" on the Turin Shroud", which likewise appear to form a letter L. Critics of this idea consider this item to be a rectangular tombstone as seen on other sacred images, and say that the alleged holes are just decorative elements, as seen on the angel's wing and on various items of clothing; that the alleged shroud shows no image of a man, and that a wadded up cloth lies discarded on the tombstone.

Historian and critic Andrea Nicolotti details that the Hungarian Pray Codex has no relation to the Shroud of Turin both having differences, and associations are created by a misunderstanding of medieval iconographic conventions and art motifs. The liturgical manuscript follows standard Byzantine influenced Romanesque artistic traditions rather than being a portrait of a relic. He considered the "L-shape" a common design element in medieval manuscript illumination, and the "zig-zag" pattern is not a herringbone weave, but the tomb lid itself and is a recognized decorative style for rendering stone. The depiction of Christ as nude and cross armed is also already contextualized by similar contemporary works such as the Ingeborg Psalter and Sacramentary of Robert of Jumièges.
