= Adilbreth =

Hungarian nobleman

Ispán of Somogy
- Reign: c. 1133–1134
- Predecessor: Theobald (1111–1113)
- Successor: Nicholas (c. 1141–1162)
- Died: after 1134

Adilbreth (died after 1134), was a Hungarian nobleman in the first half of the 12th century, who served as ispán of Somogy County from around 1133 to 1134.

== Career ==
His name is a High German variant of the names Athalbrath, Adilbrecht, Albrecht. He had a brother comes Kaladinus. Adilbreth administered Somogy County during the reign of Béla II of Hungary. His jurisdiction extended to areas beyond the Drava in the province Slavonia too.

As ispán, Adilbreth was involved in the long-lasting lawsuit over the forest Dubrava (Dombró) between the Diocese of Zagreb and local noblemen. Adilbreth was among them, who initiated a retrial before the synod of Várad (present-day Oradea, Romania). There, Felician, Archbishop of Esztergom ruled in favor of the bishopric in 1134. According to his verdict, the castle warriors of Somogy County, among others, unlawfully held portions in Dubrava. The document implies that ispán Adilbreth and his castle warriors possessed lands and portions in the surrounding area by their position, thus Somogy County extended to the territory of present-day Croatia during that time. Adilbreth was succeeded by a certain Nicholas, son of Paul by the time of the reign of Géza II of Hungary.

== Sources ==
- Szeberényi, Gábor (2017). "Zala és Somogy megye a Dráván túl. Megjegyzések a szlavóniai igazgatástörténet Árpád-kori rekonstrukciójának néhány kérdéséhez [Zala and Somogy counties beyond the river Drava. Remarks on some aspects of administration in Sclavonia during the Árpád age]". In Szanka, Brigitta; Szolnoki, Zoltán; Juhász, Péter (eds.). Középkortörténeti tanulmányok 9 (in Hungarian). University of Szeged. pp. 319–335. ISBN 978-963-315-347-5.
- Tóth, Valéria (2016). Személynévadás és személynévhasználat az ómagyar korban [Personal name-giving and personal name-usage in the Old Hungarian Era] (in Hungarian). Debrecen University Press. ISBN 978-963-318-572-8.
- Zsoldos, Attila (2011). Magyarország világi archontológiája, 1000–1301 [Secular Archontology of Hungary, 1000–1301] (in Hungarian). História, MTA Történettudományi Intézete. ISBN 978-963-9627-38-3.
