= Annales Posonienses =

The Annales Posonienses or Annals of Pressburg (Hungarian: Pozsonyi Évkönyv) are the only extant early medieval annals written in the Kingdom of Hungary. However, they are rather a collection of notes which, as the historian Carlile Aylmer Macartney emphasizes, "hardly" deserves "the name of annals". The annals contain short records of events occurring between 997 and 1203. They are named after Pressburg (now Bratislava, Slovakia) where the Pray Codex – the manuscript preserving its text – was held at St. Martin's Cathedral until 1813 by the collegiate chapter.

== Sources ==
- Macartney, C. A. (1953). The Medieval Hungarian Historians: A Critical & Analytical Guide. Cambridge University Press. ISBN 978-0-521-08051-4.
- Kristó, Gyula (1999). "Pozsonyi Évkönyv [=Annals of Pressburg]". In Kristó, Gyula (ed.). Az államalapítás korának írott forrásai [=Written Sources of the Age of the Foundation of the State] (in Hungarian). Szegedi Középkorász Műhely. pp. 354–356. ISBN 963-482-393-9.
