= Rado (palatine) =

Palatine of Hungary
- Reign: c. 1057
- Predecessor: Zache
- Successor: Otto Győr
- Died: 1057
- Spouse: Lucia

Rado (Hungarian: Radó; died 1057) was a noble in the Kingdom of Hungary, who served as palatine (Latin: comes palatii) around 1057, during the reign of Andrew I of Hungary.

As palatine, Rado donated some land estates to the Abbey of Szávaszentdemeter (Latin: Sirmium; today Sremska Mitrovica, Serbia) in 1057. He died in that same year. Later his widow, Lucia commemorated her orphaned relatives in a charter.

His name is Slavic. It is possible that Rado was a descendant of Gabriel Radomir, a son of Bulgar Emperor Samuel (r. 997–1014).

== Sources ==
- Markó, László (2006). A magyar állam főméltóságai Szent Istvántól napjainkig;– Életrajzi Lexikon [The High Officers of the Hungarian State from Saint Stephen to the Present Days;– A Biographical Encyclopedia] (in Hungarian) (2nd ed.). Budapest: Helikon Kiadó Kft. ISBN 963-547-085-1. OCLC 44128135.
- Tuzson, John (2002). István II (1116-1131): A Chapter in Medieval Hungarian History. Eastern European Monographs. ISBN 978-0-88033-500-3.
- Zsoldos, Attila (2011). Magyarország világi archontológiája, 1000–1301 [Secular Archontology of Hungary, 1000–1301] (in Hungarian). Budapest: História, MTA Történettudományi Intézete. ISBN 978-963-9627-38-3.

Political offices
Preceded by Zache	Palatine of Hungary c. 1057	Succeeded by Otto Győr
