= Theobald (ispán) =

Hungarian nobleman

Ispán of Somogy
- Reign: 1111–1113
- Predecessor: Grab (c. 1090)
- Successor: Adilbreth (c. 1133–1134)
- Died: after 1113
- Noble family: gens Tibold
- Father: Grab (?)

Theobald from the kindred Tibold (Hungarian: Tibold nembeli Tibold; died after 1113), was a Hungarian nobleman in the early 12th century, who served as ispán of Somogy County at least from 1111 to 1113.

== Career ==
Theobald (Thebaldus or Teobaldus) was born into the namesake gens (clan) Tibold, which originated from the Kingdom of Germany. It is possible that his father was Grab, who administered Somogy County in the early 1090s.

Theobald elevated into the position of ispán by 1111, during the reign of Coloman, King of Hungary. He is first mentioned in this capacity, when he accompanied his king into Dalmatia, where Coloman reaffirmed the Dalmatian towns' – Split, Trogir and Zadar – liberties in 1111. Theobald's in the escort of the monarch is also reflected by the two privilege letters of the Zobor Abbey, issued in 1111 and 1113.

According to Croatian historian Vjekoslav Klaić, Theobald held the office of ban of Slavonia sometime during his career, because later members of the kindred identified themselves "de genere Tybold bani".

== Sources ==
- Magyar, Kálmán (2001). "Szent István király államszervezésének somogyi emlékeiről [The Memories of the State Organization of King Saint Stephen in Somogy County]". In Bertalan, Béla (ed.). Tabi Kilátó 2000–2001 (in Hungarian). Tab Város Polgármesteri Hivatal. pp. 27–48. ISSN 0237-580X.
- Pálosfalvi, Tamás (2014). The Noble Elite in the County of Körös (Križevci), 1400–1526 (in Hungarian). MTA Bölcsészettudományi Kutatóközpont. ISBN 978-963-962-7840.
- Zsoldos, Attila (2011). Magyarország világi archontológiája, 1000–1301 [Secular Archontology of Hungary, 1000–1301] (in Hungarian). História, MTA Történettudományi Intézete. ISBN 978-963-9627-38-3.
