= Márkó =

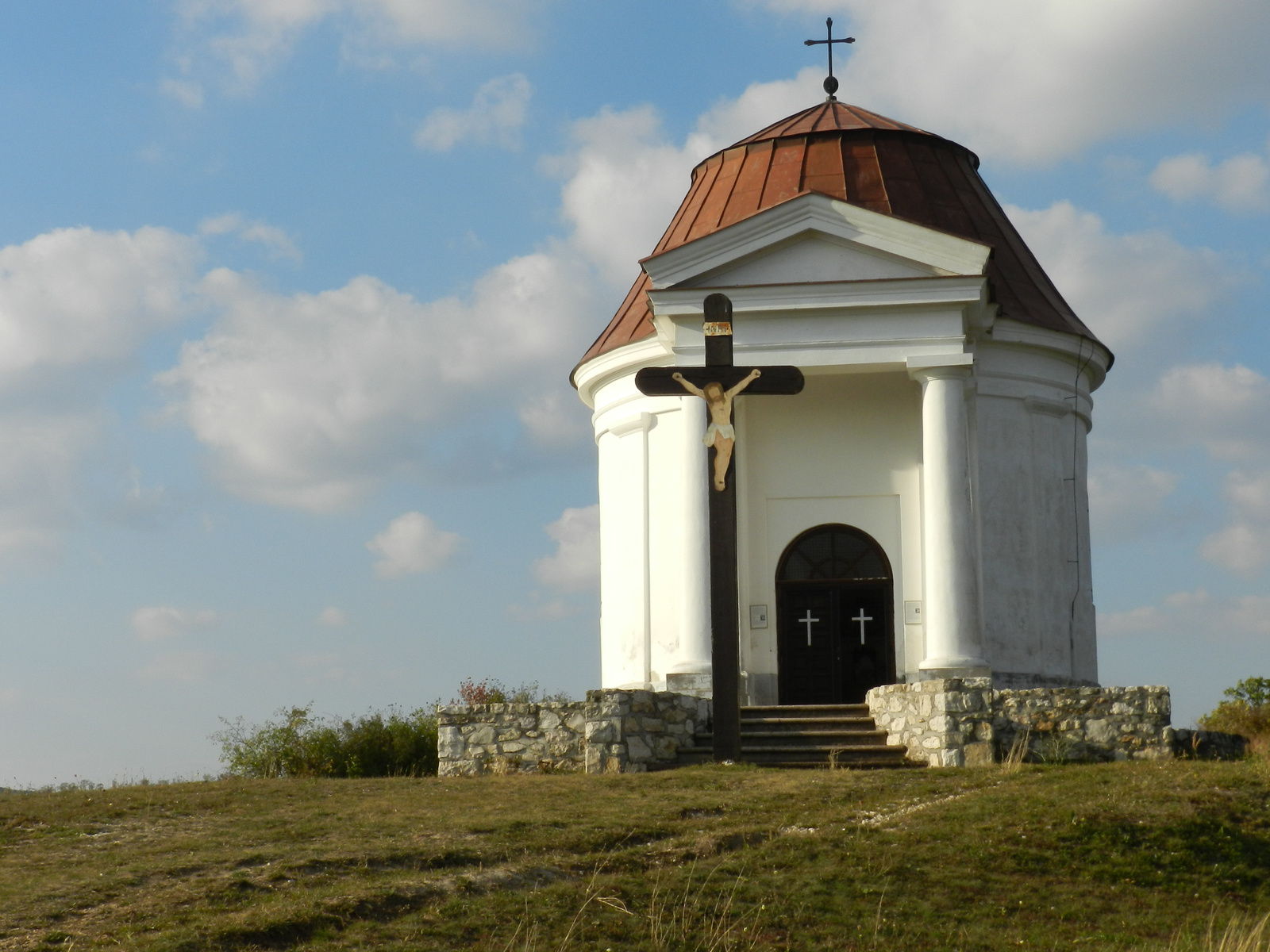
- Calvary Chapel in Márkó

- Flag Coat of arms

- Location of Veszprém county in Hungary
- Location of Márkó in Hungary
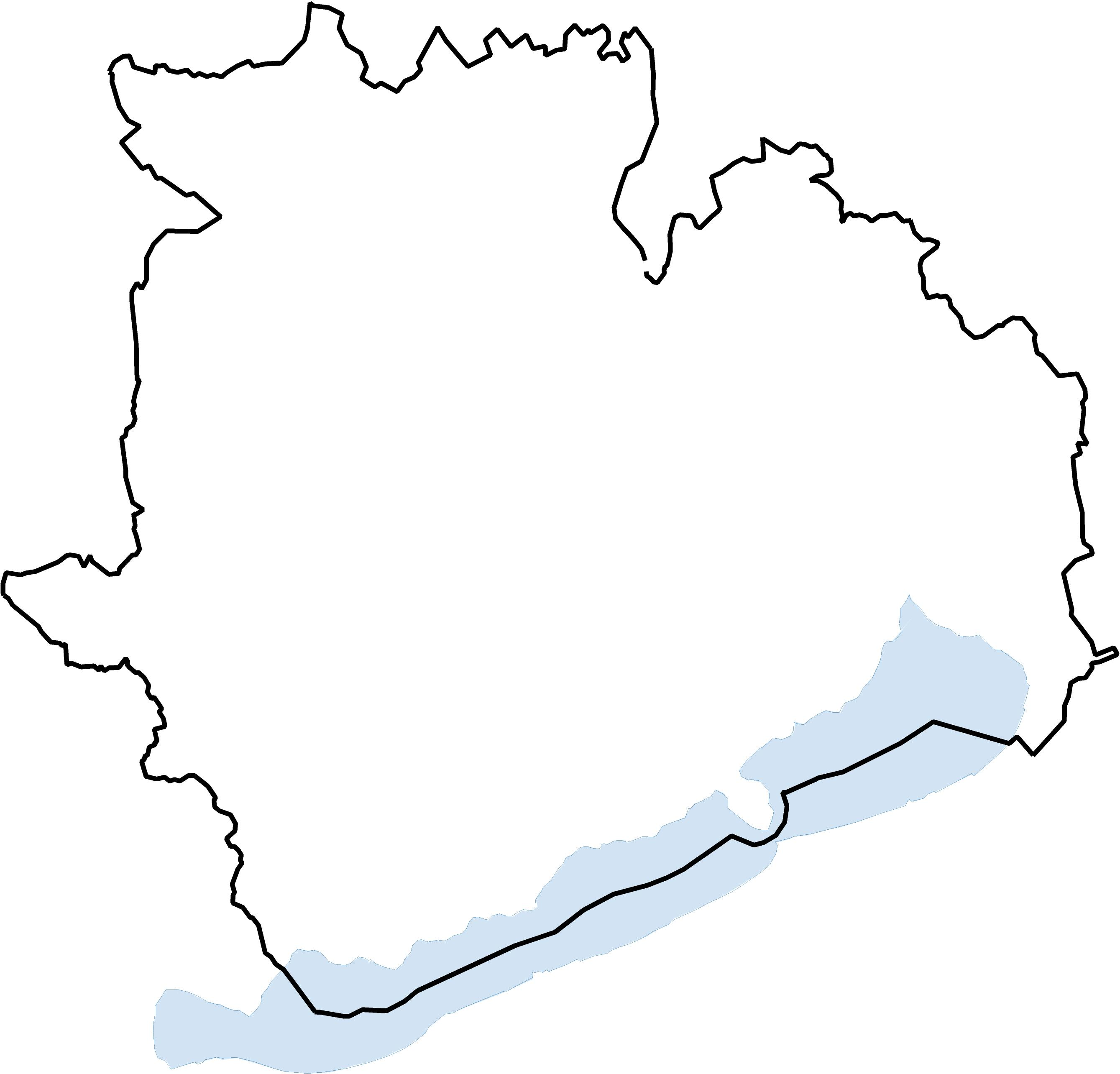
- Location of Márkó Márkó (Hungary)
- Coordinates: 47.12197°N 17.81315°E
- Country: Hungary
- County: Veszprém
- District: Veszprém District

Government
  - Type: Village
  - Mayor: Szabolcs Szalai (Independent)

Area
  - Total: 34.41 km^{2} (13.29 sq mi)

Population (2025)
  - Total: 1,790
  - Density: 52.0/km^{2} (135/sq mi)
- Time zone: UTC+1 (CET)
  - Summer (DST): UTC+2 (CEST)
- Postal code: 8441
- Area code: (+36) 88
- Website: marko.hu

Márkó (german: Markusdorf, Marko or Markau) is a village in Veszprém county, Hungary. There were 1,790 inhabitants in 2025.

== Location ==
It lies 9 kilometers west of Veszprém and 5 kilometers east of Herend. It can be reached from both cities via Main road 8, turning off onto Route 8313. The Hungarian State Railways No. 20 Székesfehérvár–Szombathely railway line also passes through the area; the local station in the center of the village is accessible via Road 83 111, which branches off Road 8313 to the north. The nearest town, Bánd, lies 3 kilometers to the west.

== History ==
Archeological finds and medieval documents indicate that several settlements, including the village of Saint Mark, once stood on the site of the present-day town. Life only began anew in the 18th century on the sites of the villages that had been destroyed and depopulated during the Turkish era. In 1741, Bishop Márton Padányi Bíró and the chapter of Veszprém invited German and Italian settlers to this region, who founded and built Márkó. For a long time, it was a typical singe-street settlement.

Its Baroque Roman Catholic church was built in 1754. By the end of the 18th century, the German settlers had also built their own church, which was burned down Good Friday of 1834. In its memory, the late-Classical-style Calvary Chapel was erected on the nearby hill in 1839.

Most of the German-speaking residents were displaced after World War II, and they were replaced by a Hungarian-speaking population.

== Public life ==
=== Mayors ===
- 1990–1994: Migray Emőd (Independent)
- 1994–1998: Kardos János (Independent)
- 1998–2002: Kardos János (Independent)
- 2002–2006: Kardos János (Independent)
- 2006–2010: Szabó Gyula (Independent)
- 2010–2014: Hartmann Antal (Independent)
- 2014–2019: Hartmann Antal (Independent)
- 2019–2024: Hartmann Antal (Fidesz–KDNP)
- 2024– : Szalai Szabolcs (Independent)

== Population ==
Population trends in the village:

In the 2011 census, 84.8% of residents identified as Hungarian, 11.8% as German, 0.2% as Romani, and 0.2% Serbian (15% did not specify; due to dual identities, the total may exceed 100%). The religious distribution was as follows: Roman Catholic 49%, Reformed 6.9%, Lutheran 0.9%, Greek Catholic 0.2%, non-denominational 15.8% (26% did not specify).

In 2022, 93% of the population identified as Hungarian, 5.5% as German, 0.3% as Romanian, 0.3% as Romani, 0.1% as Polish, Greek, Bulgarian, Rusyn, Ukrainian, Slovak, and 3.1% other, non-native nationalities (7% did not respond; due to dual identities, the total may exceed 100%). By religion, 32.6% were Roman Catholic, 7.3% Reformed, 1.4% Lutheran, 0.3% Greek Catholic, 0.1% Jewish, 1.4% other Christian, and 14.8% non-denominational (40.7% did not answer).

== Points of Interest ==
- Some of the houses still preserve the architectural styles and traditions of folk architecture.
- On the hill rising from the plateau, the white chapel and stations of the Calvary are visible from afar (a particularly interesting feature is that the Székesfehérvár–Szombathely railway line crosses the Calvary; and the Way of the Cross crosses over the tracks via a pedestrian overpass in the section before the station preceding the chapel).

== Gallery ==
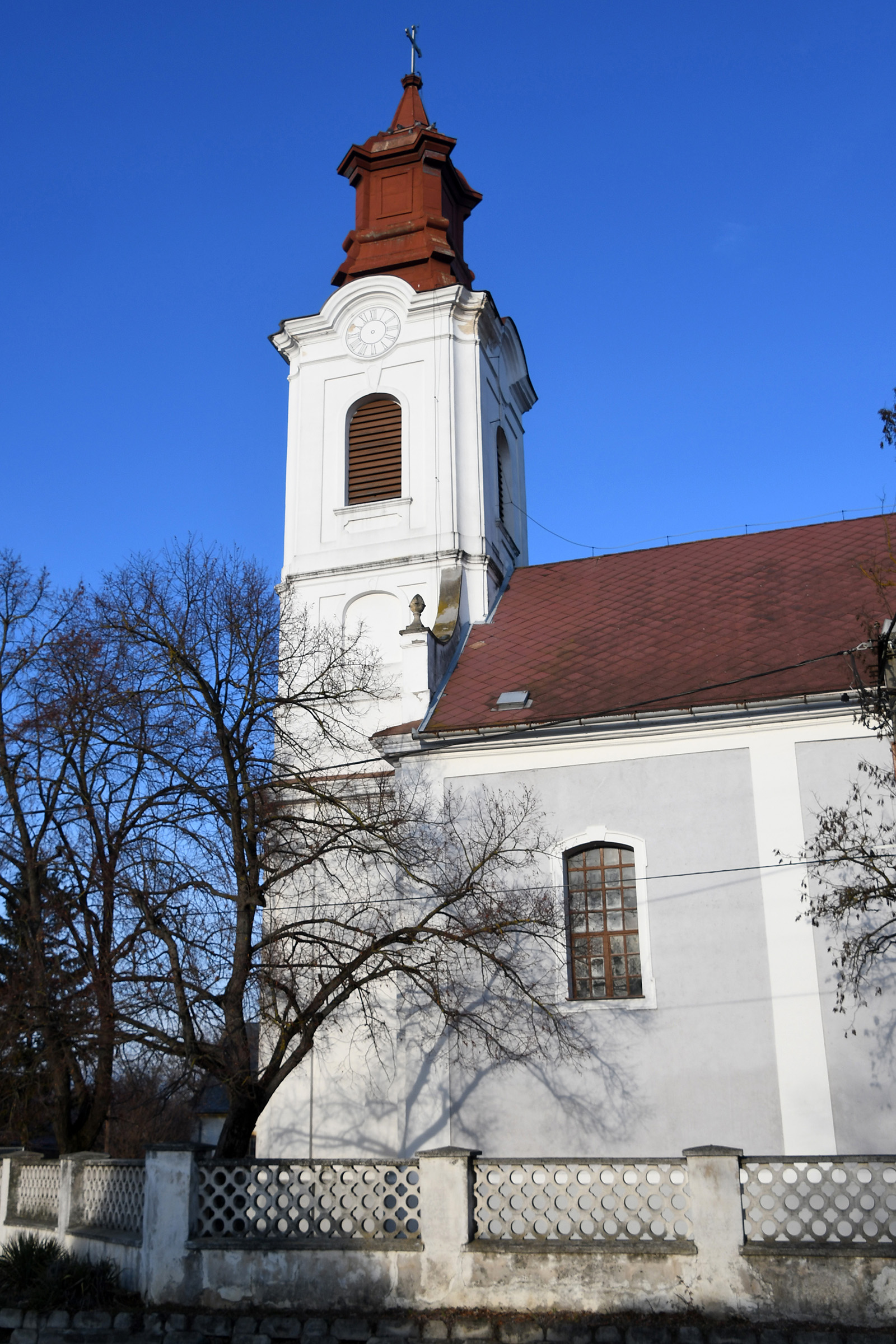
Roman Catholic Saint Mark Temple

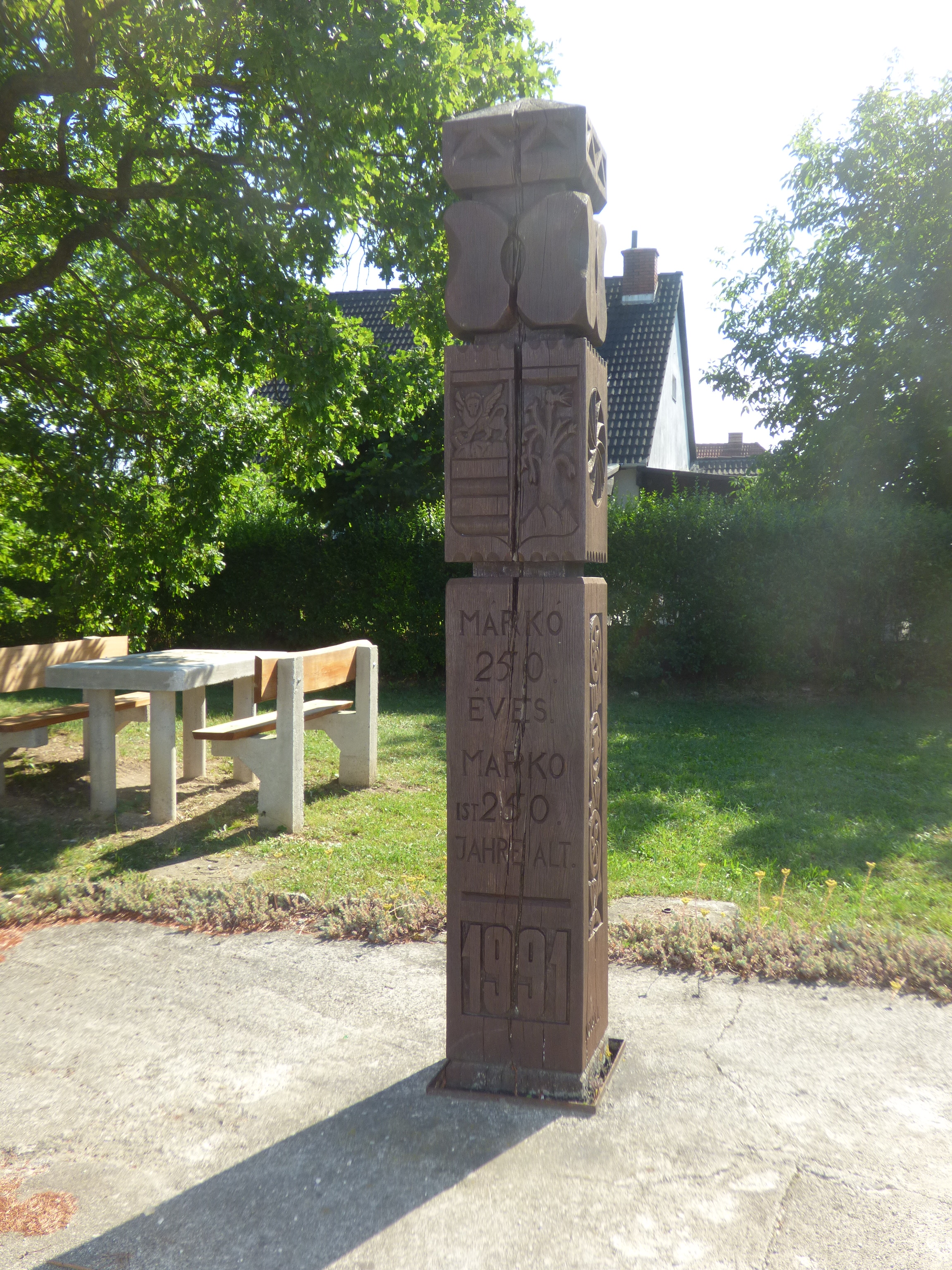
Márkó's 250-year-old memorial column

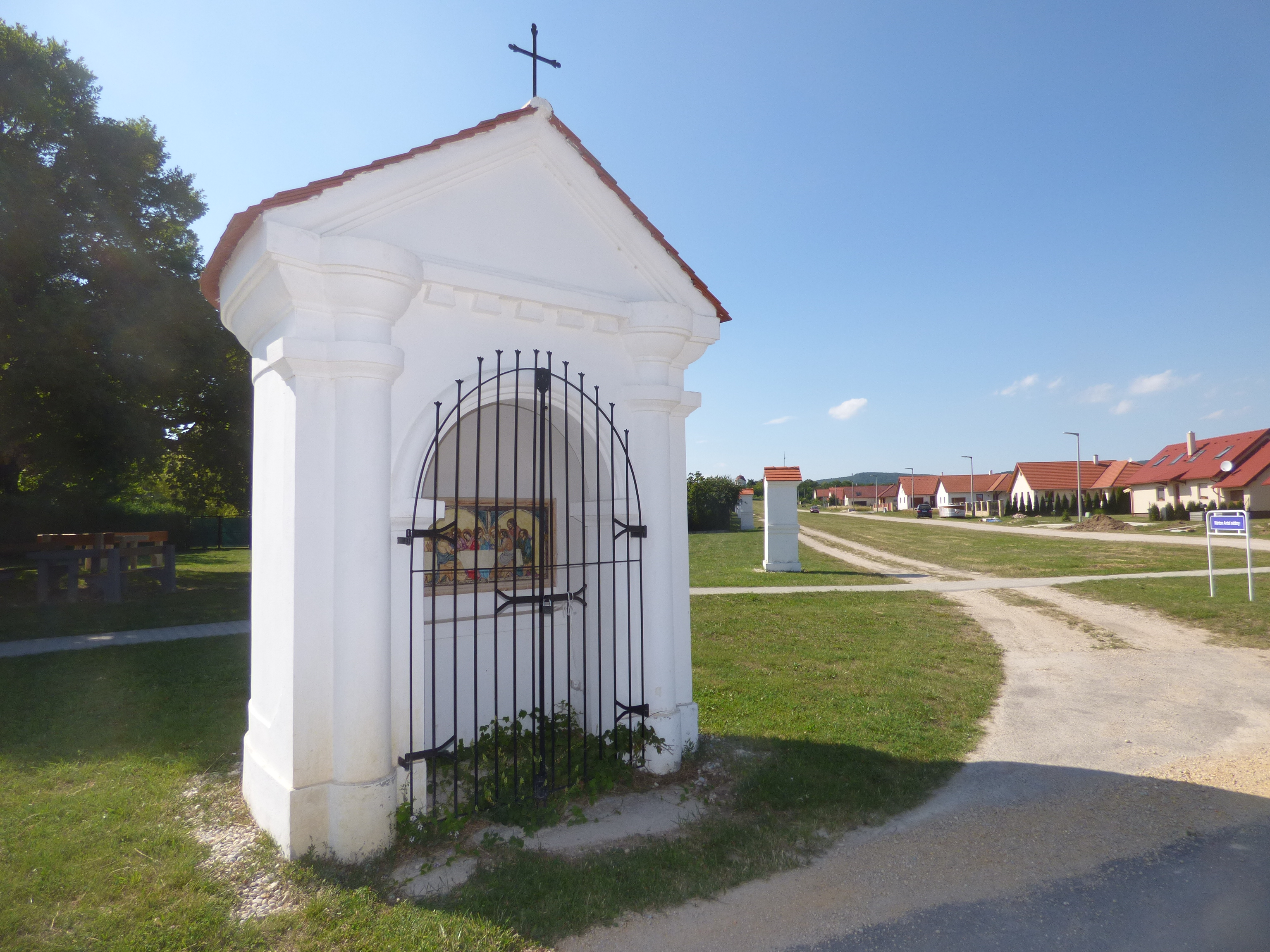
The first station of the Calvary of Márkó

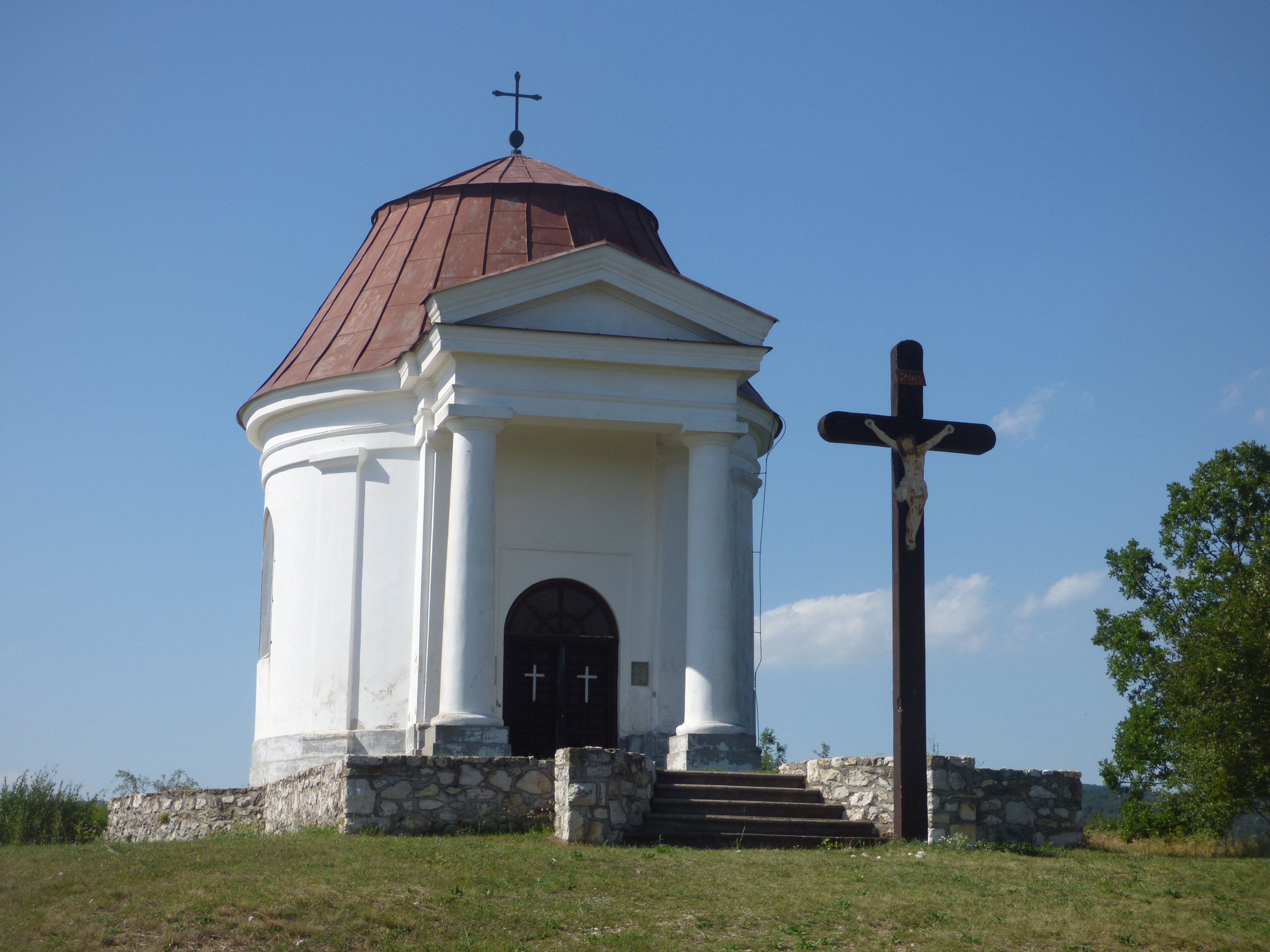
The Calvary Chapel

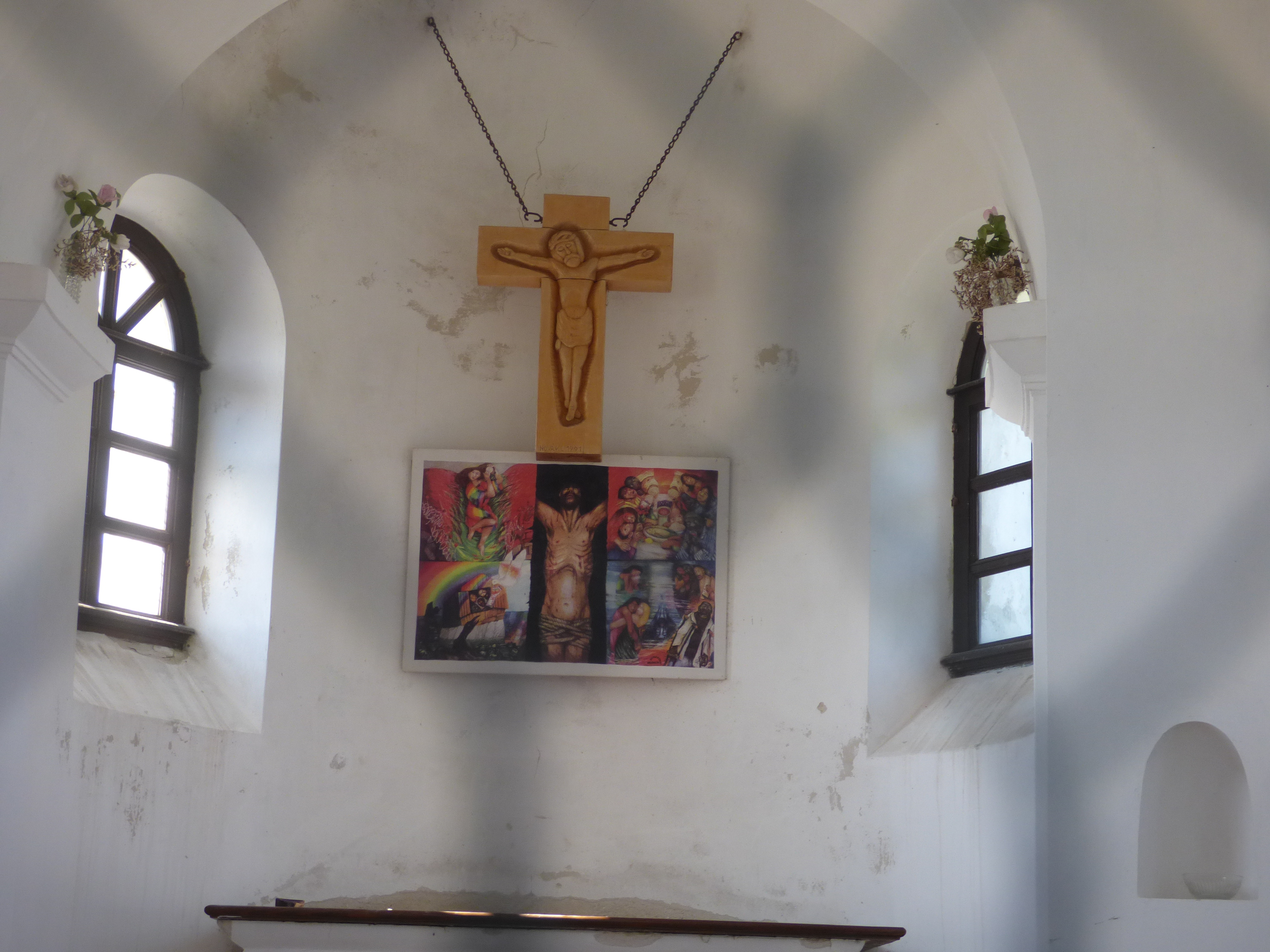
The interior of the Calvary Chapel

== More information ==
- Márkói katolikus templom fotói
- Irány Magyarország!: Márkó
- Street map (Hungarian)
