= Lamentations of Mary =

Hungarian poem

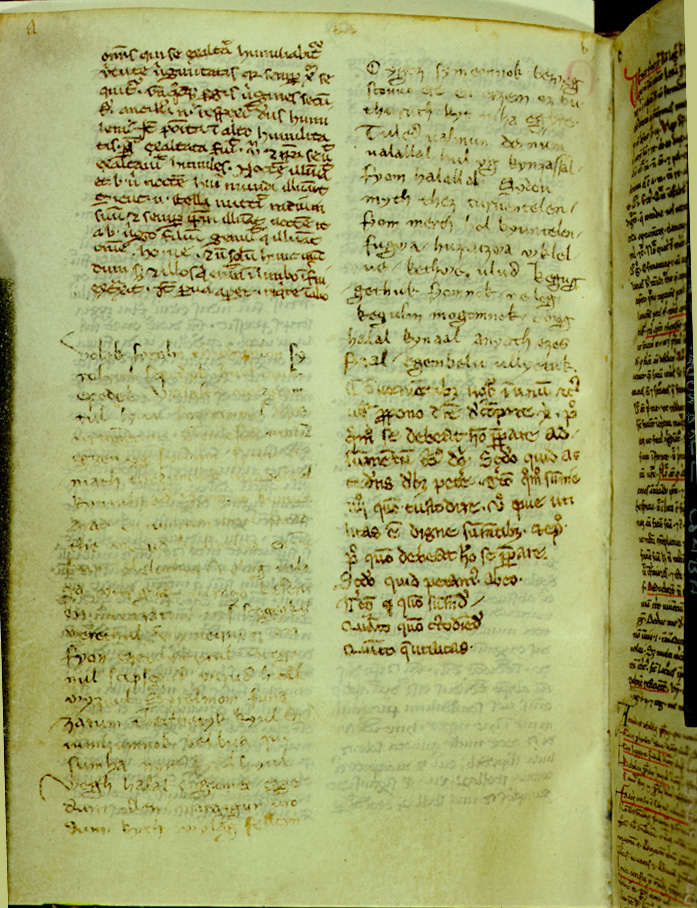
The Old Hungarian Lamentations of Mary is the oldest surviving Hungarian poem

The Old Hungarian Lamentations of Mary (Hungarian: Ómagyar Mária-siralom) is the oldest existing Hungarian poem. It was copied in c. 1300 into a Latin codex, similar to the first coherent Hungarian text, the Halotti beszéd (Funeral Oration), which was written between 1192 and 1195. Its text is a translation or adaptation of a version of the poem, or rather "sequence", that begins Planctus ante nescia and that was very widespread in medieval Europe. The speaker of the poem is Mary, mother of Jesus as she laments the crucifixion of her son, Jesus Christ, while at the side of his cross on Calvary. As such the poem constitutes an element of Roman Catholic religious poetry. Its interpretation has been much discussed in Hungarian philology, and the meaning of some words and phrases remains disputed. Pais Dezső's interpretation is given herein, but it also relies on earlier relevant results.

== The text of the poem ==
Original text	Pronunciation (by Dezső Pais)	Modern Hungarian (by Ferenc Molnár)	English
Volek ſyrolm thudothlon ſy rolmol ſepedyk. buol oʒuk epedek ··	Volék sirolm tudotlon. Sirolmol sepedik, buol oszuk, epedek,	Nem ismertem a siralmat, Most siralom sebez, Fájdalom gyötör, epeszt.	I did not know the lament yet, Now lament gashes, Ache lacerates, languishes.
Walaſth vylagum tul ſydou fyodumtul eʒes urumētuul.	Választ világumtuul, zsidou fiodumtuul, ézes ürümemtüül.	Elválasztanak világosságomtól, Zsidó fiamtól, Édes örömemtől.	Separates me from my light, Jew, from my son, My sweet delight.
O en eſes urodū eggen yg fyodum ſyrou a / / niath thekunched buabeleul kyniuhhad.	Ó én ézes urodum, eggyen-igy fiodum, sírou anyát teküncsed, buabeleül kinyuhhad!	Én édes Uram, Egyetlenegy fiam, Síró anyát tekintsed, Fájdalmából kivonjad!	O my sweet Lord, My only one son, Glance at the weeping mother, Withdraw her from her pain!
Scemem kunuel arad en iunhum buol farad the werud hullothya en iū / hum olelothya	Szemem künyüel árad, junhum buol fárad. Te vérüd hullottya én junhum olélottya.	Szememből könny árad, Szívem kíntól fárad, Te véred hullása, Szívem alélása.	From my eyes tears are flooding, My heart tires from torment, Your blood's falling, My heart's languishing.
Vylag uila ga viragnak uiraga. keſeru / en. kynʒathul uoſ ſcegegkel werethul.	Világ világa, virágnak virága, keserüen kinzatul, vos szegekkel veretül!	Világ világa, Virágnak virága, Keservesen kínoznak, Vasszegekkel átvernek!	World's light, Flower's flower, They torment bitterly, With iron nails they pierce you!
Vh nequem en fyon eʒes meʒuul Scege / nul ſcepſegud wirud hioll wyʒeul.	Uh nekem, én fiom, ézes mézüül, szégyenül szépségüd, vírüd hioll vizeül.	Jaj nekem, én fiam, Édes, mint a méz, Megrútul szépséged, Vízként hull véred!	Woe to me, my son, Sweet as honey, Your beauty turns to ugliness, Your blood falls like water!
Syrolmom fuha / ʒatum therthetyk kyul en iumhumnok bel bua qui ſumha nym ~~kyul~~ hyul	Sirolmom, fuhászatum tertetik kiül, én junhumnok bel bua, ki sumha nim hiül.	Siralmam, fohászkodásom Láttatik kívül, Szívem belső fájdalma Soha nem enyhül.	My lament, my prayer, Can be seen from outside, My heart's inner ache Never abates.
Wegh halal engumet / egge dum illen / maraggun uro dum / kyth wylag felleyn	Végy halál engümet, eggyedűm íllyen, maraggyun urodum, kit világ féllyen!	Végy halál engemet, Egyetlenem éljen, Maradjon meg Uram, Kit a világ féljen!	Take me, death, Let my only one to live, Keep him, my Lord, Whom the world should fear!
O ygoʒ ſymeonnok beʒʒeg ſcouuo ere en erʒem ez bu / thuruth / kyt niha egyre.	Ó, igoz Simeonnok bezzeg szovo ére: én érzem ez bútürüt, kit níha egíre.	Ó, az igaz Simeonnak; Biztos szava elért, Érzem e fájdalom-tőrt, Amit egykor jövendölt.	O for the just Simeon's; Certain word reached me, I can feel this dagger of pain, What long ago he foretold.
Tuled ualmun de num ualallal / hul yg kynʒaſſal / fyom halallal.	Tüüled válnum; de nüm valállal, hul igy kinzassál, fiom, halállal!	Ne váljak el tőled, Életben maradva, Mikor így kínoznak Fiam, halálra!	May I not be separated from you, Staying alive, When they are tormenting you, My son, to death!
Sydou myth theʒ turuentelen / fyom merth hol byuntelen / fugwa / huʒtuʒwa wklel / / ue / ketwe / ulud.	Zsidou, mit téssz türvéntelen, Fiom mert hol biüntelen. Fugvá, husztuzvá, üklelvé, ketvé ülüd!	Zsidó, mit tész, törvénytelen! Fiam meghal, de bűntelen! Megfogva, rángatva, Öklözve, megkötve Ölöd meg!	Jew, what you do is lawless! My son died, but he is guiltless! Clenched, hitched him, Plummered, bound him, You killed him!
Kegug / gethuk fyomnok / ne leg / kegulm mogomnok / owog halal kynaal / anyath eʒes fyaal / egembelu ullyetuk.	Kegyüggyetük fiomnok, ne légy kegyülm mogomnok! Ovogy halál kináal anyát ézes fiáal egyembelű üllyétük!	Kegyelmezzetek meg fiamnak, Ne legyen kegyelem magamnak, Avagy halál kínjával, Anyát édes fiával Együtt öljétek meg!	Have mercy on my son, No mercy for me, Or with the torment of death, The mother with her own son, Kill them together!
