= Kaposszentjakab =

Coordinates: 46°21′20″N 17°49′50″E

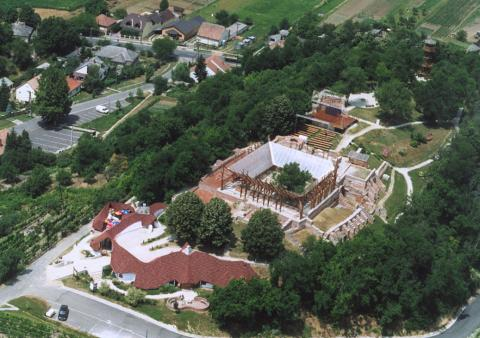
Aerial view of the monastery ruins

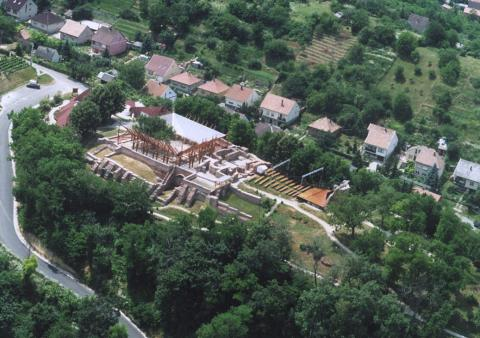
Aerial view of the ruins

Kaposszentjakab (formerly called Zselicszentjakab) is the site of a ruined Benedictine monastery. The monastery site and the surrounding village is now a suburb of the city of Kaposvár in southwestern Hungary.

== History ==
The village was the place of a St Benedict monastery in the Árpád age. Some lands in the village were the private properties of the Genere Győr. In 1256 the members of the Genere Győr had given their Zselicszentjakab family monastery to Pannonhalma Archabbey. In 1328 the Genere Győr (Péter and Miklós, sons of Derzs) and the abbot of Zselicszentjakab changed back the lands of the monastery by the lands of Rábacsécsény at the Pannonhalma Archeabbey.

The Somogy County villages suffered great devastation during the Turkish wars, and Zselicszentjakab monastery was also destroyed.

== Architecture ==
The ruins shows the ground plan of the church building and the monastery. The church had three naves. Architectural comparisons proved the eastern connections of the central space, with four columns. This church belonged to the Eastern Orthodox (Caucasian, Byzantine) tradition, in common with churches in Tarnaszentmária, Feldebrő, Székesfehérvár, and Szekszárd. Ruins of a central spaced chapel can also be found north of the monastery buildings.
