= Phonological history of Hungarian =

There are numerous regular sound correspondences between Hungarian and the other Uralic languages. For example, Hungarian á corresponds to Khanty o in certain positions, and Hungarian h corresponds to Khanty x, while Hungarian final z corresponds to Khanty final t. These can be seen in Hungarian ház ("house") and Khanty xot ("house"), or Hungarian száz ("hundred") and Khanty sot ("hundred").

== Stop consonants ==
=== Word-initially ===
One important innovation of Hungarian is the lenition of the stop consonants *p *k in initial position.

- Hungarian /f/ corresponds to Finnish and Estonian /p/ (compare English fish to Italian pesce via Grimm's law):

Proto-Uralic	Hungarian	Finnish	Estonian	meaning
*pawi	fa	puu	puu	tree
*pala	falat	pala	pala	bit, bite
*pele-	fél	pelätä	pelgama	to fear
*pesä	fészek	pesä	pesa	nest
*pilwe	felhő	pilvi	pilv	cloud
*puna-	fon	punoa	punuma	to plait
*päŋe	fej	pää	pea	head

- Before front vowels (e é i í y ä ö ő ü ű), Hungarian /k/ corresponds to Finnish and Estonian /k/:

Proto-Uralic	Hungarian	Finnish	Estonian	meaning
*küńele	könny	kyynel	küünistama	tear
*käte	kéz	käsi	käsi	hand, arm
*kiwe	kő	kivi	kivi	stone

- Before back vowels (a á o ó u ú), Hungarian /h/ corresponds to Finnish and Estonian /k/ (as English /h/ in hound corresponds to Latin /k/ in canis)

Proto-Uralic	Hungarian	Finnish	Estonian	meaning
*kala	hal	kala	kala	fish
*kota	ház	kota	koda	house (Hung.), hut (Finn. and Est.)
*kuńśe	húgy	kusi	kusi	urine

The third stop inherited from Proto-Uralic, *t, did not undergo such a change.

- Hungarian initial /t/ corresponds to Finnish and Estonian /t/:

Proto-Uralic	Hungarian	Finnish	Estonian	meaning
*tälwä	tél	talvi	talv	winter
*tumte-	tud	tuntea	tundma	to know
*towke	tavasz	touko		spring

=== Word-medially ===
Original stops were also lenited in the middle of words (now sometimes word-final, due to the loss of word-final vowels in the Old Hungarian period), but with different outcomes:

- Hungarian /p k/ correspond to Finnish and Estonian geminate stops /pp kk/:

Proto-Uralic	Hungarian	Finnish	Estonian	meaning
*ëppe	após	appi		father-in-law
*säppä	epe	sappi	sapp	gall
*lappɜ	lapos	lappea	lapp	flat
*lükkä-	lök	lykätä : lykkää-	lükkama	to push

- Hungarian /t/ corresponds to the Finnish and Estonian two-stop cluster /tk/:

Proto-Uralic	Hungarian	Finnish	Estonian	meaning
*kütke-.	köt	kytkeä	kütke	to bind, to join (Estonian: "halter", a derivative)
*totke	tat (dialectal)		tõtkes	tench

(No examples where a word with original *tt would have survived in both Hungarian and Finnic are known, but cases testifying for the development of *tt to /tt/ in Finnic and /t/ in Hungarian can be set up with the help of the other Uralic languages.)

- Hungarian /d/ corresponds to Finnish and Estonian /nt/ (which may alternate with /nn/):

Proto-Uralic	Hungarian	Finnish	Estonian	meaning
*ëmta-	ad	antaa	andma	to give
*jänte	ideg	jänne : jäntee-		nerve (Hung.; a derivative), string, sinew (Fi.)
*omte	odú	ontelo	õõnes	hollow
*tumte-	tud	tuntea	tundma	to know

(Again, with the help of the other Uralic languages, the analogous developments *mp *ŋk → Hungarian /b g/, Finnic /mp ŋk/ could be supported.)

- Hungarian /v/ corresponds to Finnish and Estonian /p/:

Proto-Uralic	Hungarian	Finnish	Estonian	meaning
*kepä	kevés	kepeä	kebja	few (Hung.), light (Finnic)
*čupa	sovány	hupe-ne-	huba	thin (Hung.)

- Hungarian /z/ corresponds to Finnish and Estonian /t/ (which can alternate with /d/ or zero, and becomes /s/ before /i/):

Proto-Uralic	Hungarian	Finnish	Estonian	meaning
*kota	ház	kota	koda	house (Hung.), hut (Finnic)
*käte	kéz	käsi : käden : käte-	käsi : käe : käte-	hand, arm
*pata	fazék	pata	pada	pot
*mete	méz	mesi : meden : mete-	mesi : mee : mete-	honey

- Hungarian zero, here always preceding a long vowel, corresponds to Finnish and Estonian /k/ by itself (which may alternate with zero or /h/) and as the first member of a consonant cluster:

Proto-Uralic	Hungarian	Finnish	Estonian	meaning
*ikene	íny	ien : ikene-	ige	palate (Es.), gums (Hung. & Fi.)
*joke	jó	joki : joen	jõgi	river (only in placenames in Hung.)
*mëksa	máj	maksa	maks	liver
*näke-	néz	nähdä : näke-	nägema	to see
*sükśe	ősz	syksy	sügis	autumn

== Sibilant consonants ==
Two different regular correspondences can be found in Hungarian for Finnish and Estonian /s/. The first is Hungarian /s/ (which is written as ⟨sz⟩):

Proto-Uralic	Hungarian	Finnish	Estonian	meaning
*śata	száz	sata	sada	hundred
*śüδäme	szív	sydän	süda	heart
*śilmä	szem	silmä	silm	eye
*śuwe	száj	suu	suu	mouth
*pesä	fészek	pesä	pesa	nest

The second is Hungarian zero:

Proto-Uralic	Hungarian	Finnish	Estonian	meaning
*sewe-	eszik : ev-	syödä	sööma	to eat
*säppä	epe	sappi	sapp	gall
*sëne	ín	suoni	soon	sinew, (Finnic also) vein
*süle	öl	syli	süli	bosom

These two correspondences represent two different original consonants. /s/ : /s/ is reconstructed as originating in Proto-Uralic *ś, while ∅ : /s/ is reconstructed as Proto-Uralic *s. Both correspondences can be seen simultaneously in the word for "autumn" (see above under *-k-), from Proto-Uralic *sükśi.

== Sonorant consonants ==
- Hungarian liquid consonants /l r/ correspond to Finnish and Estonian /l r/:

Proto-Uralic	Hungarian	Finnish	Estonian	meaning
*ora	ár	ora	ora	awl (Hung., Es.), thorn (Fi.)
*alla	alatt	alla	all	under
*elä-	él	elää	elama	to live
*kala-	hal	kuolla	koolema	to die
*läme	lé : lev-	liemi	leem	liquid (Hung.), broth (Finnic)
*ńale-	nyal	nuolla	noolima	to lick
*ńële	nyíl	nuoli	nool	arrow
*wolka	váll	olka	õlg	shoulder

Examples also include 'bite', 'to fear', 'cloud', 'fish', 'winter', 'flat', 'to push', 'bosom' listed above.

- Hungarian nasal consonants /m n ɲ/ correspond to Finnish and Estonian /m n n/:

Proto-Uralic	Hungarian	Finnish	Estonian	meaning
*mi	mi	mikä : mi-	mis	what
*mene-	megy : men-	mennä	minema	to go
*mińä	meny	miniä	minia	daughter-in-law
*muna	mony (dialectal)	muna	muna	egg, testicle
*neljä	négy	neljä	neli	four
*nime	név	nimi	nimi	name

Further examples include /m/: 'honey', 'liver', 'eye', /n/: 'to plait', 'to see', 'sinew', /ɲ/: 'tear', 'palate', 'arrow', 'to lick' listed above. Word-internally a correspondence Hungarian /v/ : Finnic /m/ is also found, as seen in 'broth', 'name', and 'heart'.

- A correspondence can also be set up between Hungarian /g/ and Finnish and Estonian long vowels. With the help of the other Uralic languages, this can be reconstructed as *ŋ:

Proto-Uralic	Hungarian	Finnish	Estonian	meaning
*jäŋe	jég	jää	jää	ice
*piŋe	fog	pii	pii	tooth
*püŋe	fogoly	pyy	püü	hazelhen
*śäŋe	ég	sää		sky (Hung.), weather (Fi.)
*šiŋere	egér	hiiri	hiir	mouse
*wiŋe-	vég	viimeinen	viimane	end (Hung.), last (Finnic)

== See also ==
- Selected cognates in the Uralic languages
- Common vocabulary among Finno-Ugric languages
- The living fish swims in water
