= Establishing charter of the abbey of Tihany =

Manuscript with oldest written Hungarian

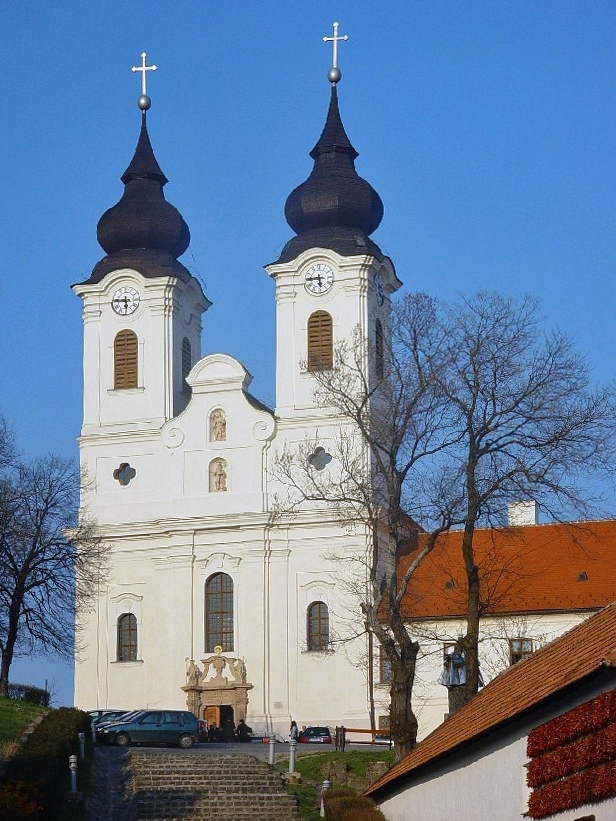
Abbey church of Tihany

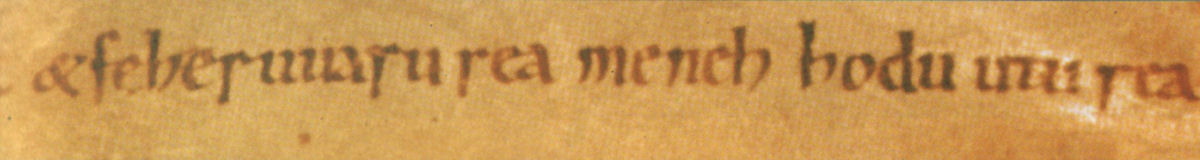
The longest Hungarian fragment in the Latin text

The establishing charter of the abbey of Tihany is a document known for including the oldest written words in the Hungarian language. The document, dated to 1055, lists the lands the king donated to the newly founded Tihany Abbey. It is mostly in Latin, but contains several Hungarian words and expressions, the longest of which is feheruuaru rea meneh hodu utu rea (in modern Hungarian: Fehérvárra menő hadi útra, 'onto the military road leading to Fehérvár').

== Background ==
The Benedictine abbey of Tihany was founded by King Andrew I and was dedicated to the Virgin Mary and Aignan of Orleans. The establishing charter is likely to have been composed by Bishop Nicholas. The Benedictine monks were settled in Tihany by King Andrew, who had a church and a monastery built for them on the hill of the Tihany peninsula near Lake Balaton. The charter, written on vellum, is today in the Benedictine Pannonhalma Archabbey.

The road mentioned must have been a military road from Roman times, still used in medieval times. It was the most important road from Fehérvár to the south. Fehérvár – today Székesfehérvár – was one of the most important cities of medieval Hungary.

== Content ==
The Hungarian words in the text reflect 11th-century Hungarian language. Not only proper nouns, but common nouns and expressions are included. The longest of these, & feheruuaru rea meneh hodu utu rea clearly shows a language stage in which the -ra suffix (-re after front vowels) has not yet evolved into a suffix from a postposition, and in which the final vowels are still preserved (compare 'Feheruuaru' with modern 'Fehérvár' and 'utu' with modern 'út' – do not pay attention to the diacritics as in 1055 Hungarian spelling was not yet developed to show the a/á and u/ú difference, although they must have existed in pronunciation). In total, the document includes 58 Hungarian words, among them Tichon, an early spelling of the name Tihany.

== See also ==
- History of the Hungarian language
- Funeral Sermon and Prayer, the oldest existing text written completely in Hungarian
- Lamentations of Mary, the oldest existing poem in Hungarian
