= Funeral Sermon and Prayer =

12th-century Hungarian text

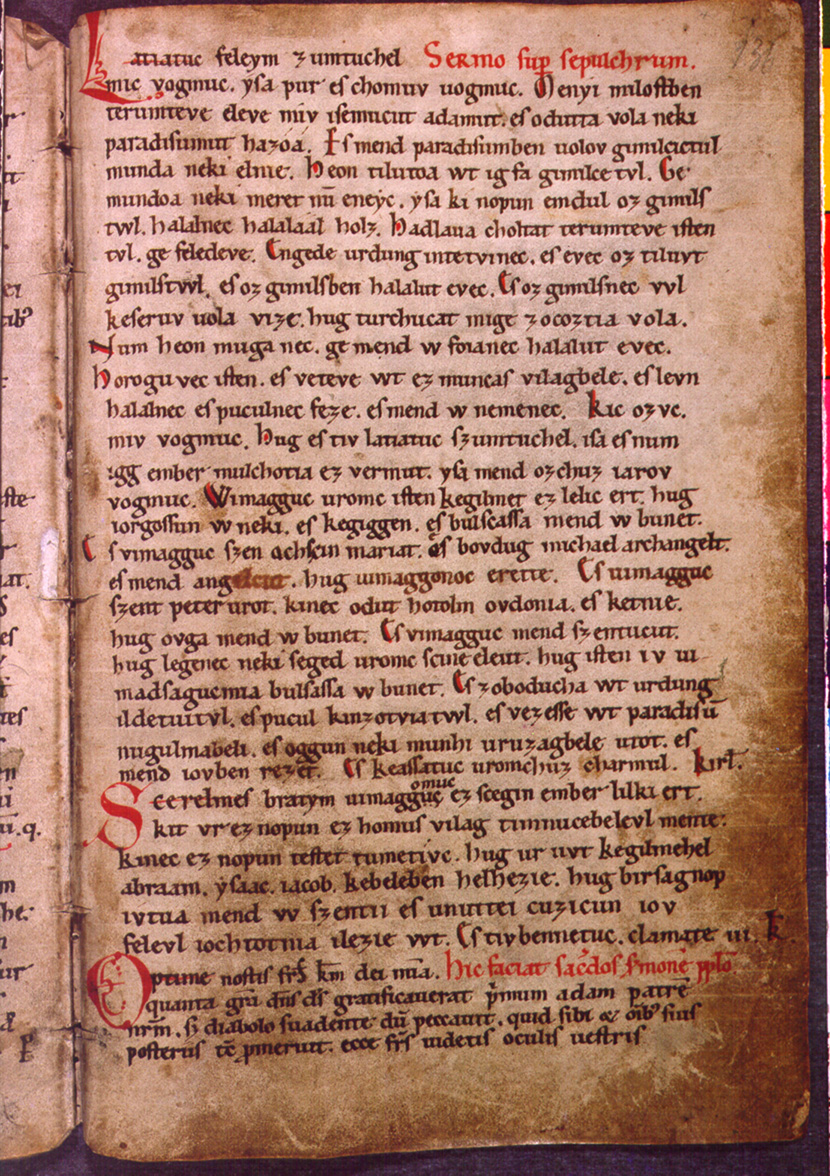
Original manuscript in the Pray Codex

The Funeral Sermon and Prayer (Hungarian: Halotti beszéd és könyörgés) is the oldest known surviving contiguous Hungarian text, written by one scribal hand in the Latin script and dating to 1192–1195. It is found on f.154a of the Codex Pray.

== Importance ==
The importance of the Funeral Sermon resides from being the oldest surviving Hungarian and as such also the oldest Uralic, text — although individual words and even short partial sentences appear in charters, such as the founding charter of the Veszprém valley nunnery (997–1018/1109) or the founding charter of the abbey of Tihany (1055).

== Structure ==
The whole monument has two parts: the sermon's text (26 lines and 227 words) and the prayer (6 lines and 47 words). Not counting repeated words, there are 190 individual terms in the text. The work was written after a Latin version, which has been identified and can be found in the very codex. However, the Funeral Sermon and Prayer is a new composition based on it, rather than a mere translation. Since 1813, the manuscript has been kept in Budapest, Hungary, and is currently in the National Széchényi Library.

== Sources ==
- Gábor: Régi magyar nyelvemlékek (I.). Buda, 1838
- Zolnai, Gyula: Nyelvemlékeink a könyvnyomtatás koráig. Budapest 1984
- Benkõ, Loránd: Az Árpád-kor magyar nyelvű szövegemlékei. Budapest, 1980.
