= Nikola II Drašković =

Croatian politician (c. 1625 – 1687)

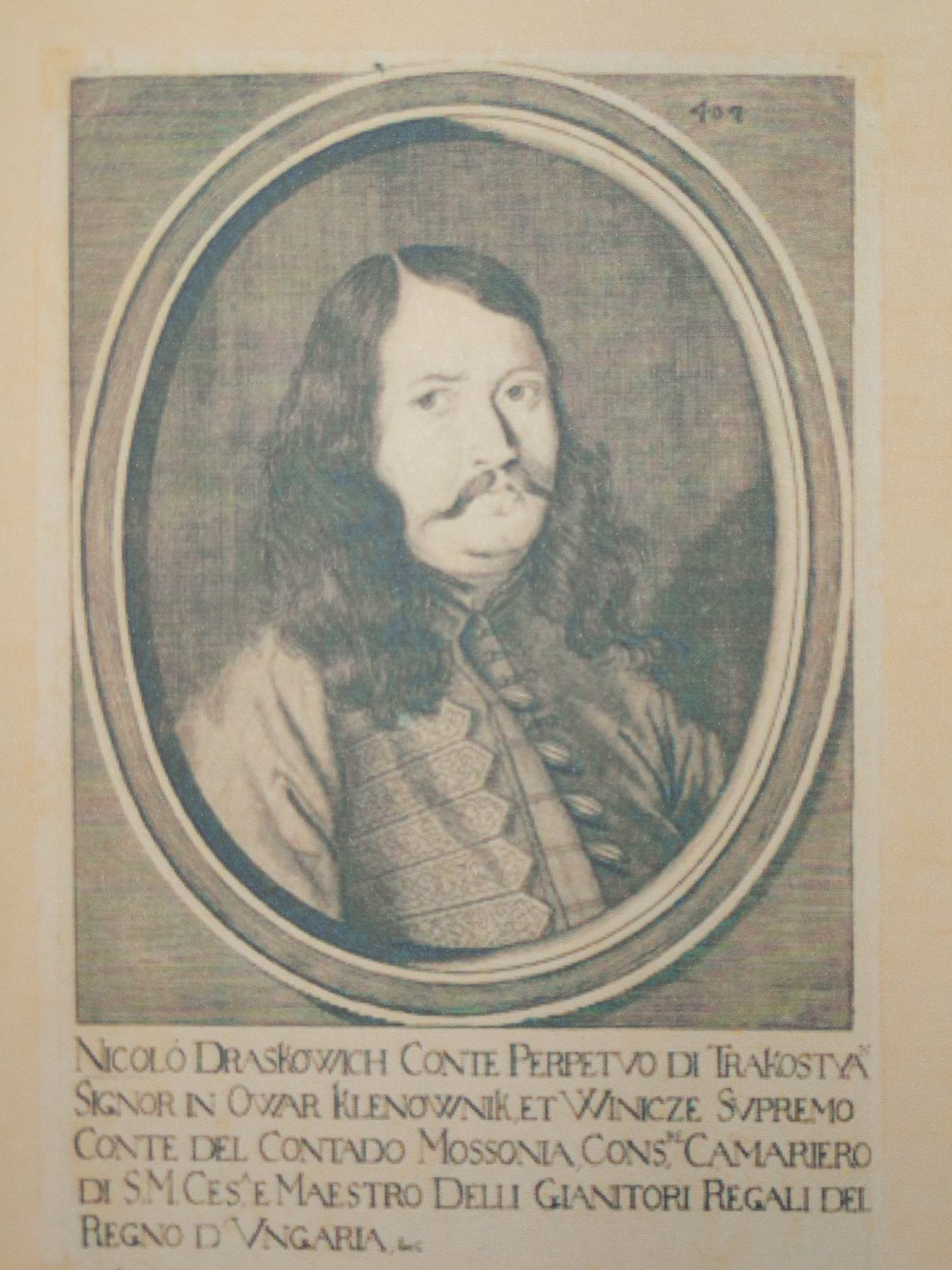
- portrait of Count Nikola II Drašković

Personal details
- Born: c. 1625
- Died: 8 October 1687
- Spouse(s): 1) Katarina nee Drugeth de Homonna, 2) Elizabeta nee Nádasdy (1646–1682), 3) Kristina nee Csáky (1654–1723)
- Children: Pavao, Marija Katarina, Adam Franjo
- Parent(s): Ivan III Drašković and Barbara Drašković nee Thurzó
- Occupation: royal chamberlain, court judge, grand zhupan king's advisor

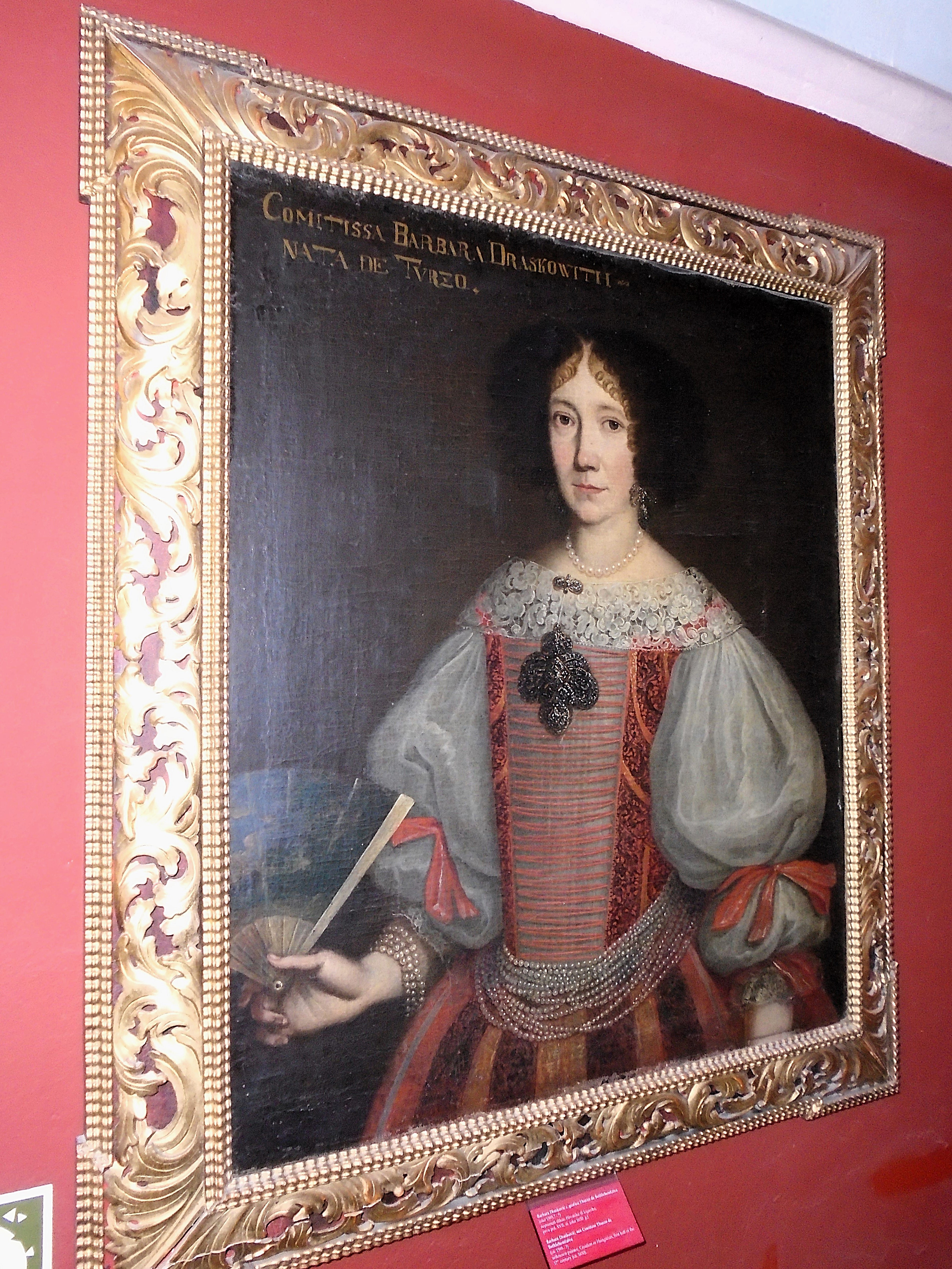
Portrait of Barbara Drašković née Thurzó, mother of Nikola II Drašković

Count Nikola II Drašković (English: Nicholas II Drashkovich of Trakoshtyan; Hungarian: trakostyáni gróf Draskovich Miklós; c. 1625 – 8 October 1687), was a Croatian–Hungarian nobleman and statesman, a member of the Drašković noble family. He was a high-ranking state official, serving as royal advisor, royal chamberlain, judge royal and lord-lieutenant of Moson County.

== Biography ==
=== Family ===
His place of birth has not been determined with certainty, as his father Ivan III Drašković, held many government positions (Croatian Ban, Hungarian palatine, king's secret advisor etc.) and the family moved several times. His mother was Countess Barbara Drašković née Thurzó, a Hungarian noblewoman, daughter of György Thurzó, Palatine of Hungary.

He had a younger brother Ivan IV. (*ca. 1630 – †1692), who studied with him at the University of Bologna in Italy. He also had three sisters (Katarina, Barbara and Juliana). His first wife was Katarina née Drugeth de Hommona. With his second marriage (in 1667) with Elizabeta née Nádasdy (1646–1682), Drašković strengthened the family's ties with that powerful and distinguished Hungarian family.

Elizabeta's father Franz III. Nádasdy was one of the main participants in the Zrinski-Frankopan Conspiracy and executed in 1671. It was later not possible to determine with certainty whether Drašković himself actively participated in the conspiracy, but he did not directly suffer the consequences after the collapse of the conspiracy. Only many years later, when Drašković died in 1687, suspicion arose that he had been poisoned, due to his alleged participation in the Conspiracy.

In his second marriage with Elizabeta he had three children - Pavao, Katarina and Adam Franjo. Pavao died relatively young without an heir, and the line was continued by the children of Adam Franjo, who had a son, Leopold. Nikola's third wife was Hungarian countess Kristina née Csáky (*1654 – †1723).

=== Career ===
After his studies in Bologna (1648–1652) he served in the civil service, but also started to take part in the battles against the army of the Turkish Empire. During his lifetime, he participated in numerous military campaigns of the Habsburg army against the Ottomans, among which he distinguished himself in the liberation of Buda in 1686, in the Battle of Körmend and in the Battle of the Raaba River. When not on military duty, he held the office as royal advisor, then royal chamberlain, grand župan of Moson County and finally judge royal. During his lifetime, Drašković was known as a collector of antiquities and numismatist.

In late 1687 he suddenly died, probably from a heart attack. His branch of the Drašković family survived until 1792, when his great-grandson Norbert died. The descendants of his brother Ivan IV have survived to the present day. Today, Ivan Alexander Drašković, the youngest heir to a long-standing noble lineage, lives and studies in Vienna, Austria, and has, together with his father, count Nikolaus, a castle and a large estate in the settlement of Veliki Bukovec in Croatia.

== See also ==
- House of Drašković
- Croatian nobility
- Trakošćan Castle

Nikola II Drašković House of Drašković Born: c. 1625 Died: 8 October 1687
Political offices
Preceded by Ádám Forgách	Judge royal 1681–1687	Succeeded by István Csáky
