= Trakošćan =

Trakošćan may refer to:

- Trakošćan Castle, a medieval castle in northern Croatia, an estate of the Drašković family
- Lake Trakošćan, a lake around the castle
- Trakošćan, Varaždin County, the village near the castle
