= Ivan III Drašković =

Croato-Hungarian warrior and statesman

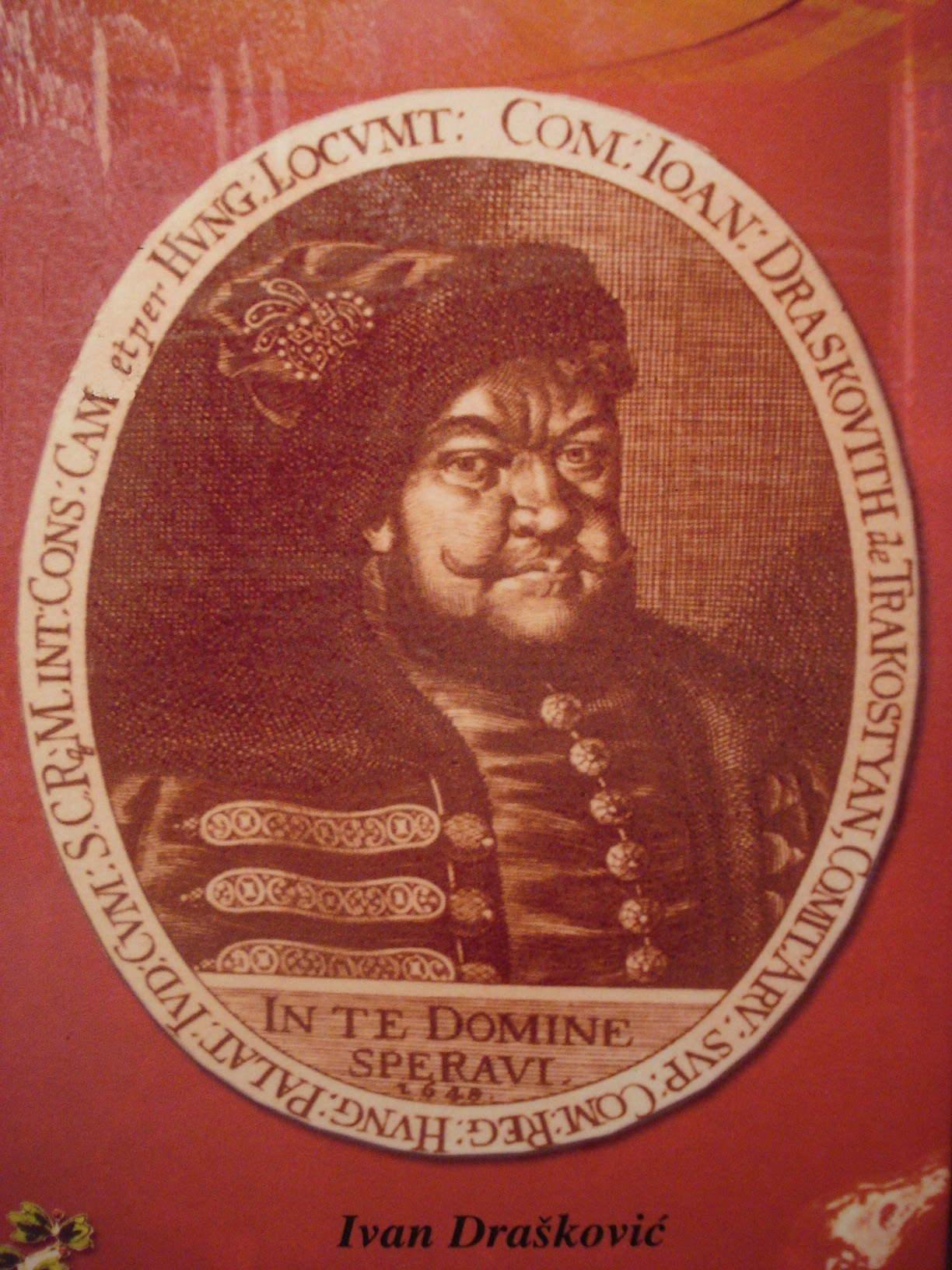

Ban of Croatia
- In office 3 September 1639 – 25 September 1646
- Preceded by: Zsigmond Erdődy
- Succeeded by: Nicholas Zrinski

Palatine of Hungary
- In office 25 September 1646 – 5 August 1648
- Preceded by: Miklós Esterházy
- Succeeded by: Pál Pálffy

Personal details
- Born: 13 March 1603 Trakošćan, Kingdom of Croatia, Habsburg monarchy
- Died: 5 August 1648 (aged 45) Óvár, Kingdom of Hungary, Habsburg monarchy (present-day Olováry, Slovakia)
- Resting place: St. Martin's Cathedral, Bratislava, Slovakia
- Spouse: Barbara Thurzó (m. 29 January 1629)
- Children: Ivan (John) IV, Barbara, Nikola (Nicholas) II, Katarina, Julija
- Parent(s): Ivan II Drašković and Eva Drašković née Istvánffy
- Occupation: cavalry captain, master of king's chamberlains, king's secret advisor, superior commander of Karlovac Military Frontier

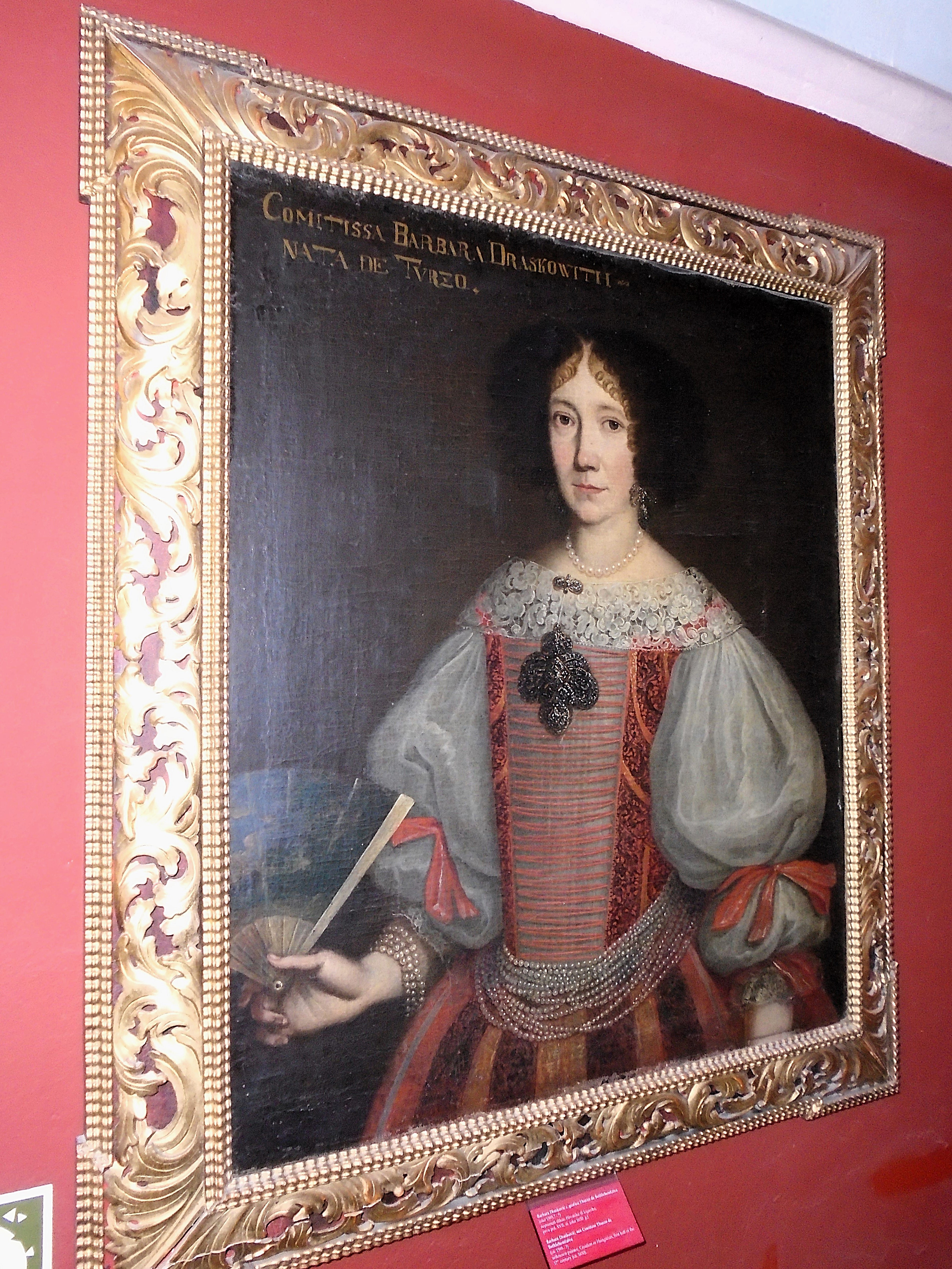
Portrait of Barbara Drašković née Thurzó, wife of Ivan III Drašković

Ivan III Drašković (English: John III Drashkovich of Trakoshtyan; Hungarian: trakostyáni gróf Draskovich János, (Trakošćan, 13 March 1595(?) or 1603 – Óvár (Kingdom of Hungary), 5 August 1648), was a Croato-Hungarian warrior and statesman, a member of the Drašković noble family. He served as Palatine of Hungary from 1646 until his death.

== Biography ==
=== Family and education ===
Count Ivan III Drašković was a son of Ivan II Petar Drašković and his wife Eva Drašković née Istvánffy. Educated in Graz, Austria, where he finished philosophy studies, and in Bologna, Italy, where he graduated in law, Drašković spoke several foreign languages. He was also enrolled at the Classical gymnasium in Zagreb.

On 29 January 1629 he married Barbara Thurzó, a Hungarian countess, and they had five children, among which two sons, John IV and Nicholas II.

=== Political and military career ===
During his lifetime, the Drašković family achieved the highest point of its power, wealth and influence. Due to his successes in battles against the Ottomans, Ivan III Drašković was well known as defensor Croatiae (English: defender of Croatia), having organised the Croatian defence forces, fortified the towns and castles, as well as built border military strongholds at the same time. On 4 September 1631 he was given (together with his brother Nicholas I and his cousin Caspar II) the title count by the Croato-Hungarian king Ferdinand II.

In his career Drašković was, among other duties, a cavalry captain, master of king's chamberlains and king's secret advisor. On 10 July 1640 he was appointed ban (viceroy) of Croatia and superior commander of Karlovac military frontier. Thus he was the third member of the family sitting (so far) on the ban's throne, after his father Ivan II and his grandfather's brother Juraj.

On 22 September 1640 the king Ferdinand III summoned a diet in Pressburg (Hungarian: Pozsony; today Bratislava, Slovakia) where Drašković was appointed palatine of Hungary, the highest dignitary in that country after the king.

=== Death and funeral ===
Having performed the high function of palatine, Drašković suddenly died on 5 August 1648 in his new domain Óvár, Nógrád County (today Olováry in the Banská Bystrica Region, southern Slovakia), he had been given a short time before his death by the king Ferdinand III. He was buried during a solemn funeral rite in the St. Martin's Cathedral in Pressburg, which served as the coronation church of the Kingdom of Hungary between 1563 and 1830. His grave is situated next to the grave of his father.

== See also ==
- House of Drašković
- List of rulers of Croatia
- Croatian nobility
- Trakošćan Castle

Ivan III Drašković House of Drašković Born: 1603 Died: 5 August 1648
Political offices
Preceded by Zsigmond Erdődy	Ban of Croatia; 3 September 1639 – 25 September 1646	Succeeded by Nicholas Zrinski
Preceded by Miklós Esterházy	Palatine of Hungary; 25 September 1646 – 5 August 1648	Succeeded by Pál Pálffy
