= Freemasonry in Croatia =

Freemasonry in Croatia (Croatian: Slobodno zidarstvo u Hrvatskoj) may be traced to the second half of the 18th century when it was introduced by the officers that came back from the Seven Years' War (1756–1763). However, the fraternity has been repeatedly banned and re-founded since then.

== History ==
=== The early years (1749–1795) ===
Freemasonry in Croatia is directly connected to the establishment of one of the first lodges in Austria, Zu den drei Kanonen in Vienna on September 17, 1749 because one of the founders of that Lodge was Croatian bishop Josip Franjo Sigismund Gondola (Gundulić), principal of the Theological Faculty at the University of Vienna. He became Lodge's Master on March 7, 1743. Since January 4, 1743 one of the members of the Lodge was Croatian Count Josip Kazimir Drašković.

The first Masonic lodge in Croatia, and also in the Balkans, was established on the territory of the Military Frontier in the town of Glina in 1764 by Croatian Count Ivan Drašković VIII under the name 'War Friendship' (Croatian: Ratno prijateljstvo, French: L’amitié de guerre, German: Zur Kriegsfreundschaft). Ivan Drašković VIII led the Lodge from 1768 to 1770. In 1778 senior army officer Petar Karel Otto Bátorkezs was elected as Lodge's Master. Official language of the Lodge was French but was later changed to Latin. Lodge was closed in 1795 when Freemasonry was prohibited in Croatia.

Count Ivan Drašković VIII encouraged the establishment of the Lodge 'Perfect Union' (Croatian: Savršen savez, French: L’union parfaite), which was established in Varaždin in 1772 by the Russian army captain Breščić, doctor Jean Baptist Lalange, Bjelovar-Križevci County prefect Count Stjepan Niczky and lawyer Pavel Kugler. This Lodge's first Master was Count Stjepan Niczky. In 1773 the lodge had 17 members. The membership grew to 37 by 1784. The Lodge changed its name twice, first in 1774 into 'Libertas' (English: Liberty, French: Liberté) and second in 1781 to 'Good advice' (Croatian: Dobar savjet, German: Zum gutten War). In 1749 Aleksander Pastori (Paszthory) become its Master. The official languages of the Lodge were Latin and German. The Lodge was closed in 1785.

Count Ivan Drašković VIII and German Lodge 'The Three Globes' established Lodge 'Prudentia' (Croatian: Razboritost) in Zagreb in 1773. In the year 1778 Bishop of Zagreb Maksimilijan Vrhovac, known under his code name "Publicola", joined the Lodge. Masters of the Lodge were Bishop of Zagreb Josip Galjuf known as "Ebiscius" (1778), doctor Ignatius Verb (1784) and doctor of philosophy and arts Antun Kukec (1786). The Official languages of the Lodge were Latin and German. In 1784 Lodge changed its name to 'Wisdom' (Croatian: Mudrost, German: Klugheit). In 1784 it had 25 members. The lodge was closed in 1786 and incorporated into the Grand Lodge of Hungary.

Count Stjepan Niczky founded in 1773 in Osijek Lodge 'Vigilance' (Croatian: Budnost, German: Zur Wachsamheit). Known Lodge's presidents were its founder, Bjelovar-Križevci County Deputy Prefect Franjo Dolovac, and Stjepan's nephew, Count Juraj Niczky. The lodge had more than 40 members. The official languages of the Lodge were Latin and German. Lodge was closed in 1791.

Count Stjepan Niczky founded another Lodge in 1773 in Križevci but it is known very little about it. It is believed that members of this unnamed Lodge were garrison sergeants deployed in the town of Križevci. Lodge was involved in the creation of the 'Grand Provincial Lodge of Croatia' (Croatian: Velika provincijalna loža Hrvatske) in 1775. Lodge was closed in 1777 due to the death of Count Niczky.

In 1775 Count Franjo Drašković and Austrian Lodge 'Zur gekrönten Hoffnung' founded in Varaždin Lodge 'Three dragons' (Croatian: Tri zmaja, German: Zu den drei Drachen), which officially started to work in 1776 under the name 'Friendship' (Croatian: Prijateljstvo, German: Zur Freundschaft). First Master of the Lodge was Count Franjo Lovro Drašković. Official language of the Lodge was German. Lodge was closed in 1795 when Freemasonry was prohibited in Austria.

In 1775 Count Ivan Drašković VIII. founded in Buda Lodge 'Generosity' (Ad magnanimitatem) (Croatian: Velikodušnost). Among 50 members, the most famous were: Archbishop of Ljubljana Michael Brigido, Baron Pavao Davidović, doctor from Dubrovnik Matija Philadelphi, Jesuit Stjepan Katona, Count Josip Klobušický, and writer Stjepan Vujanovski. Masters of that Lodge were Captain Josip Jesenvoski, Baron Josip Orczy, and Count Josip Haller.

From June 22 to 24, 1777 founding assembly for the 'Croatian Grand Lodge' (Croatian: Hrvatska Velika loža; Latomia Libertatis sub Corona Hungariae in Provinciam redacta) was held in the Brezovica Castle near Zagreb. The Grand Master of the Lodge was Count Ivan Drašković VIII. This lodge had its own rules called 'Drašković's Observance' (Croatian: Draškovićeva opservancija). Lodges in Glina, Varaždin, Zagreb and Križevci were under its protection. Lodge was divided into two districts: 'Ultra Savam' or 'War alliance' (Glina and Zagreb) and 'Cis Savam' or 'Free Association' (Varaždin and Križevci). Every district had its own Deputy Grand Master. According to Drašković's Observance, Lodge 'Stillness' from Bratislava also joined HVL.

First Lodge in Otočac, 'Invincible with weapon in our hands' (Croatian: Nepobjedivi s oružjem u rukama, French: L’invincible aux bras armés), was founded in 1777 by Ivan Drašković VIII. Its members were Austro-Hungarian officers of Croatian origin who served in the regiment Gyulay which was at the time deployed in Otočac. Grand Master was Colonel Danijel Butler-Hotkević. After regiment Gyulay moved to the Czech town of Ústí nad Labem, Lodge was moved as well and continued to work there in French.

The first 'Grand Lodge of Croatia' was founded in the year 1778. Grand Master was Count Ivan Drasković VIII., First Warden Aleksandar Pastroi, Second Warden Colonel Knežević, Deputy Grand Master Count Franjo Szplény and Secretary Captain Paunsenwien. Lodges 'Freedom' (Varaždin), 'Wisdom' (Zagreb), 'War friendship' (Glina), 'Invincible with weapon in our hands' (Otočac), 'Vigilance' (Osijek), Generosity (Budapest), Stillness (Bratislava), Green Lions (Prague) and Three White Lilies (Timișoara) were under VLH protection.

It is known that representatives of the Lodge 'Courage' (Croatian: Hrabrost, German: Zur Tapferkeit), which was founded in Karlovac in 1780 under the protection of Grand Lodge of Austria, participated in the Masonic Convention in Vienna.

Count Ivan Drasković VIII. Organized 'Assembly of the Freemasons' on February 28, 1781, in Budapest where the establishment of seven Grand Provincial Lodges was accepted. That is how the 'Grand Provincial Lodge of Transylvania, Croatia and Dalmatia' based in Hermanstadt was founded. It had twelve lodges under its protection.

Masons from Croatia had great cooperation with Lodges in Austria and Hungary so they participated together in the 'Conference of the Freemasons in Vienna' on April 22, 1784, where the new Grand Lodge was established. It was composed of four Provincial Lodges. Lodges in Croatian, Slavonia, and Dalmatia were under the 'Hungarian Provincial Lodge' because they were part of the same Kingdom.

In the year 1795 Freemasonry was banned in Austria, Hungary and consequently in Croatia after conspiracy organized by Ignác Martinovics and a certain number of Masons who wanted to start an upheaval following the example of the French Revolution was discovered. Among suspects for planning the plot was the Bishop of Zagreb Maksimilijan Vrhovac, who then burned the first part of his "Diary" (Diariuma) in which he was writing notes about his contacts with Freemasons, and Josip Kralj who fled to Budapest and eventually committed suicide in one inn. He also left a note in which he wrote: "I lived freely all my life, and would rather die free than spend even one hour in chains." All Masonic Lodges in Croatia were closed.

=== During Napoleon's rule (1806–1813) ===
During the establishment of the Illyrian provinces under the rule of Napoleon, prominent associates of the French authorities that came to Croatia were proving involved in the elite of the First French Empire by their membership in several lodges that have been established with important military garrisons that arrived to Croatia. The first lodge in the Illyrian provinces named Eugen Napoleon was founded in Zadar in 1806, and in 1808 they published Rules of the Lodge in 600 copies. In the following years lodges in Split (1806), Kotor (1807), Dubrovnik (1808), Šibenik (1809), Rijeka (1809) and Karlovac (1809) were established.

=== During the Austro-Hungarian Empire (1814–1918) ===
After the departure of the French army, the Masonic Lodges were closed again. In 1872 one Masonic lodge was founded in Sisak but it was closed working shortly afterwards, in 1885. A lodge with 6 Freemasons was established in Zagreb in 1892.

=== During Kingdom of Yugoslavia (1919–1940) ===
Royal Yugoslavia was tolerant of Freemasonry. It developed under the patronage of the Regular Grand Lodge of Serbia who had good relations with the state authorities in Belgrade, and close contacts with the King of the Kingdom of Yugoslavia. The Central Lodge of the new state was the Grand Lodge of Yugoslavia.

=== Fascism and Nazism ===
A united Yugoslavia was threatening Fascist Italy under Mussolini, whose plans for a recreated Roman Empire included annexation of Yugoslavia, the historical area of Illyria, Pannonia, and the Balkans being the ancient heritage of the Italians. One conspiracy theory perpetrated by the fascist held that the "Grand Orient masonry and its funds" were conspiring together with the Serbs against fascism and Nazism. An additional anti-Semitic claim was that Serbs were part of a "social-democratic, masonic Jewish internationalist plot". Since Serbia was the exoteric reason for World War I, Hitler desired to punish the Serbs. Anti-Serb sentiment soon engulfed Fascist Croatia after the NDH was established, and Jews, Serbs, and Freemasons were persecuted, arrested, and murdered, many being taken to the Jasenovac Concentration Camp.

=== During Socialist Federal Republic of Yugoslavia (1945–1990) ===
Freemasonry was prohibited by the law and strictly punishable so Croatian Freemasons were unable to act until the early 1990s.

=== Restoration of Freemasonry in the independent Republic of Croatia (1991–) ===
Restoration of Masonic activities began in the 1990s with the breakup of Yugoslavia.

Since 2003, the Croatian Freemasons who practice the Scottish Rite are organized in the Supreme Council of the Ancient and Accepted Scottish Rite of Freemasonry in Croatia.

== Active Grand Lodges ==
=== The Grand Lodge of Croatia ===
The Grand Lodge of Croatia (Croatian: Velika loža Hrvatske) is the all-male largest Croatian regular Grand Lodge with jurisdiction over 16 masonic lodges with around 400 members. It was founded on September 21, 1994, in Zagreb under the patronage of The Grand Lodge of Austria.

The 16 lodges under its jurisdiction are: Grof Ivan Drašković (Count Ivan Drašković), Hrvatska vila (Croatian Fairy), Tri svjetla (Three Lights), Ormus, Savršeni savez (Perfect Union), Harmonija (Harmony), Quatuor Coronati, Libertas, Isis, Pravednost (Justice), Mudrost (Wisdom), Lux Histriae, Concordia Fratrvm, Maksimilijan Vrhovac, Budnost (Vigilantia).

Also, there are five masonic bodies: Scottish Rite, Red Cross of Constantine, York Rite, Rite of Memphis-Misraim, and the Shriners.

=== Continental Freemasonry ===
The following is a list of grand lodges under Continental Freemasonry:

- International Order of Freemasonry for Men and Women 'Le Driot Humain', Le Droit Humain was founded in Croatia in 1925. The order has 7 lodges: Split, Osijek, Varaždin, and Zagreb.
- Grand National Lodge of Croatia, founded in 2014 in Rijeka
- Grand Regular Lodge of Croatia, founded in 2017 in Zagreb
- Grand Symbolic Lodge of Croatia, founded in 2018
- Grand Lodge "Croatia", founded in 2017 in Zagreb
- Grand Sovereign Lodge of Croatia "Libertas A.D. 1775", founded in 2020 in Zagreb
