= Óvári (disambiguation) =

Óvári is the Hungarian name of Oar village in Vetiș commune, Satu Mare County, Romania.

Óvári may also refer to:

- Hungarian toponymic surname meaning "someone from Óvár":
  - Zsolt Óvári
  - Éva Óvári
  - Óvári Jakab
