= Lake Trakošćan =

Artificial lake in Croatia

- Trakošćansko jezero (Croatian)
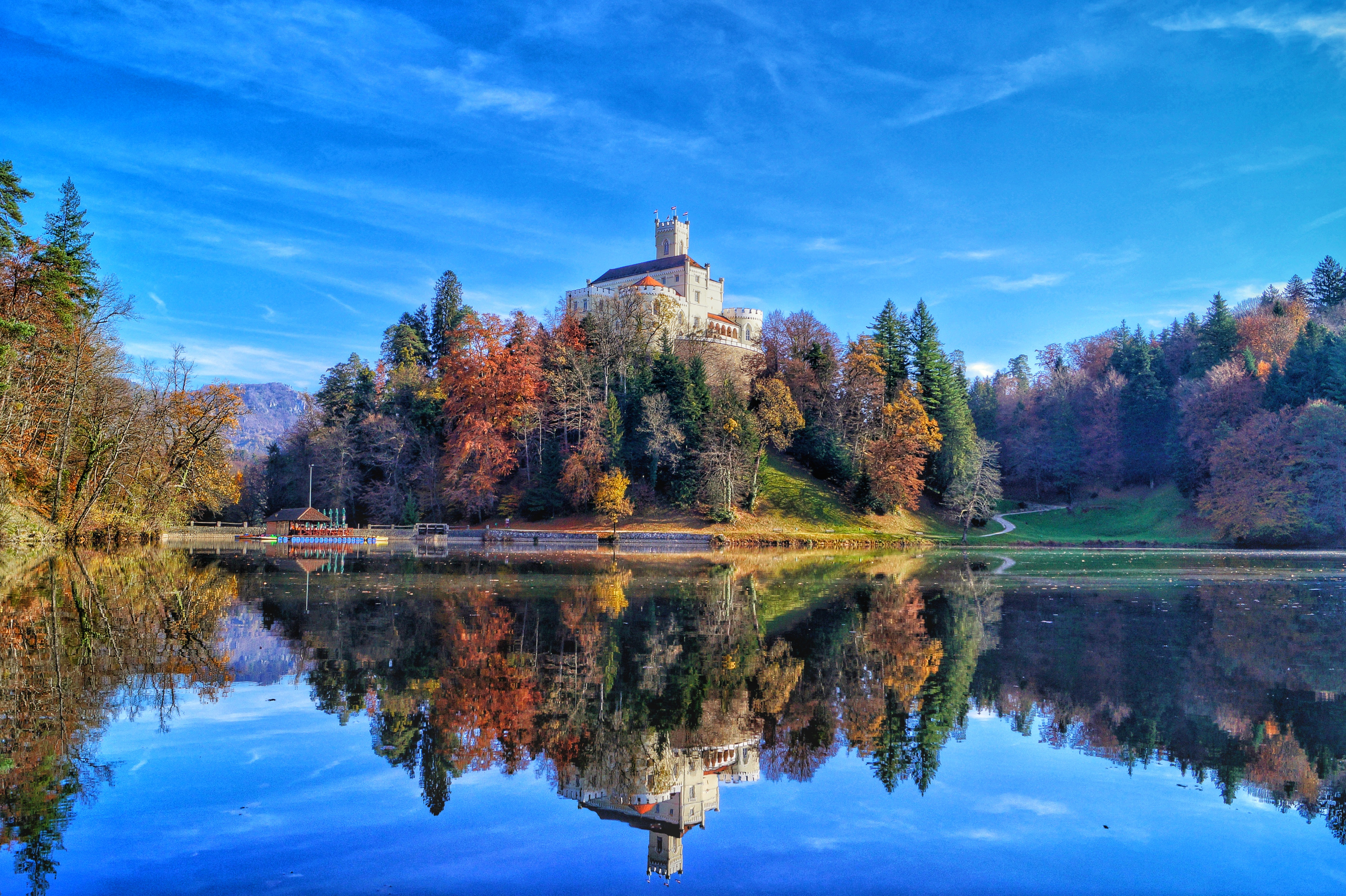
- Lake Trakošćan and Trakošćan Castle

- Location within Croatia
- Interactive map of Lake Trakošćan
- Location: Varaždin County, Croatia
- Coordinates: 46.261°N 15.937°E
- Basin countries: Croatia
- Surface area: 0.17 km^{2} (0.066 sq mi)
- Surface elevation: 255 m (837 ft)

Lake Trakošćan (Croatian: Trakošćansko jezero) is an artificial lake located in Trakošćan, Hrvatsko Zagorje, Croatia. The lake measures about 1.5 kilometres (1 mi) in length, and around 17 hectares (42 acres) in area. Its average depth is 2.5 metres (8 ft).

The water reaches temperatures up to 28 °C (82 °F) in summer. The lake freezes over for three months during the winter. At its inception, the lake functioned as a fish pond, but retained its architectural importance to the present day.

There is a forest and the landscaped park area around the lake that is protected and preserved part of the site. The forest park contains diverse flora and fauna whose richness of vegetation creates a harmonious horticultural environment.

== See also ==
- Trakošćan Castle
- List of lakes of Croatia
- House of Drašković
