= List of lakes of Croatia =

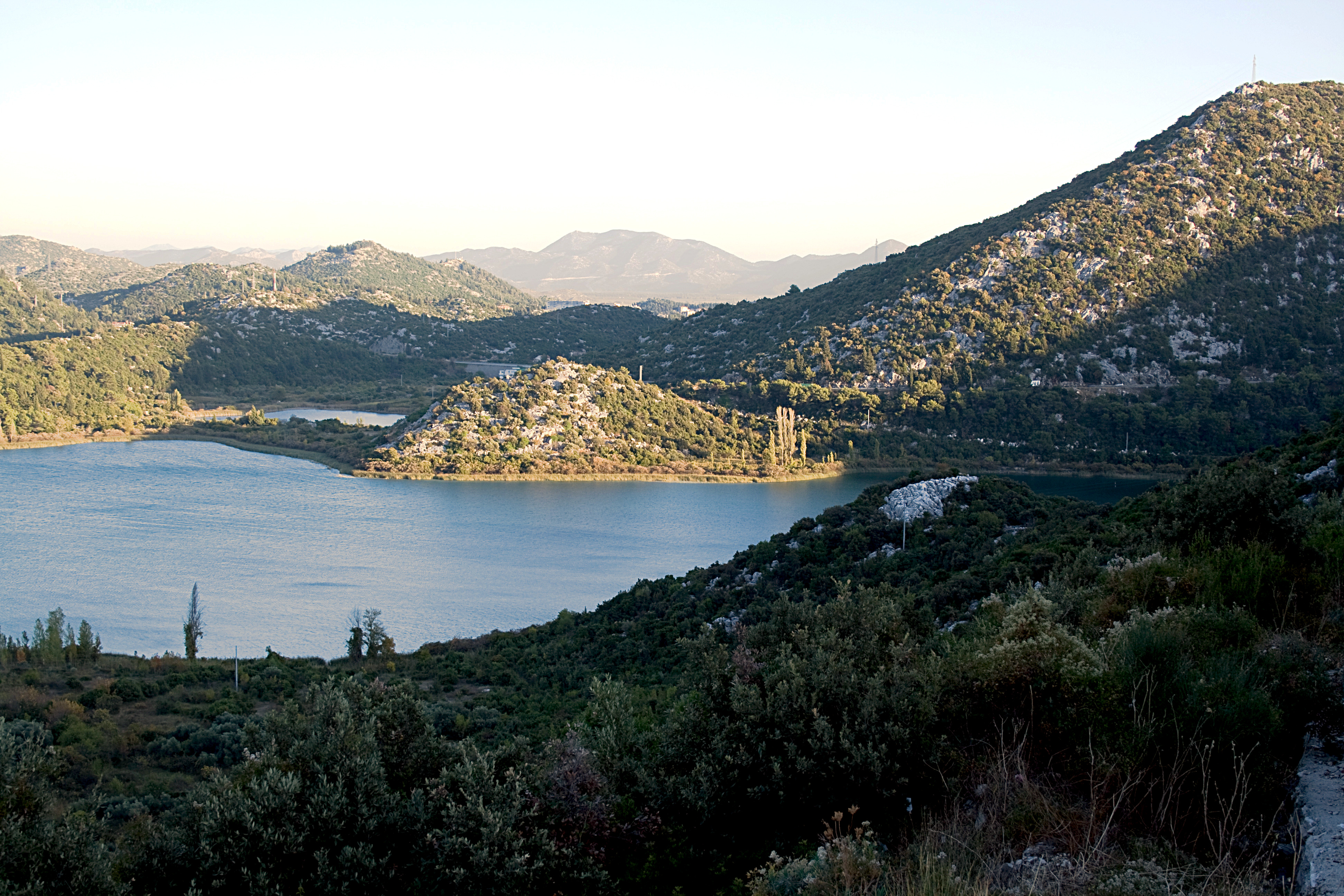
View of Baćina lakes

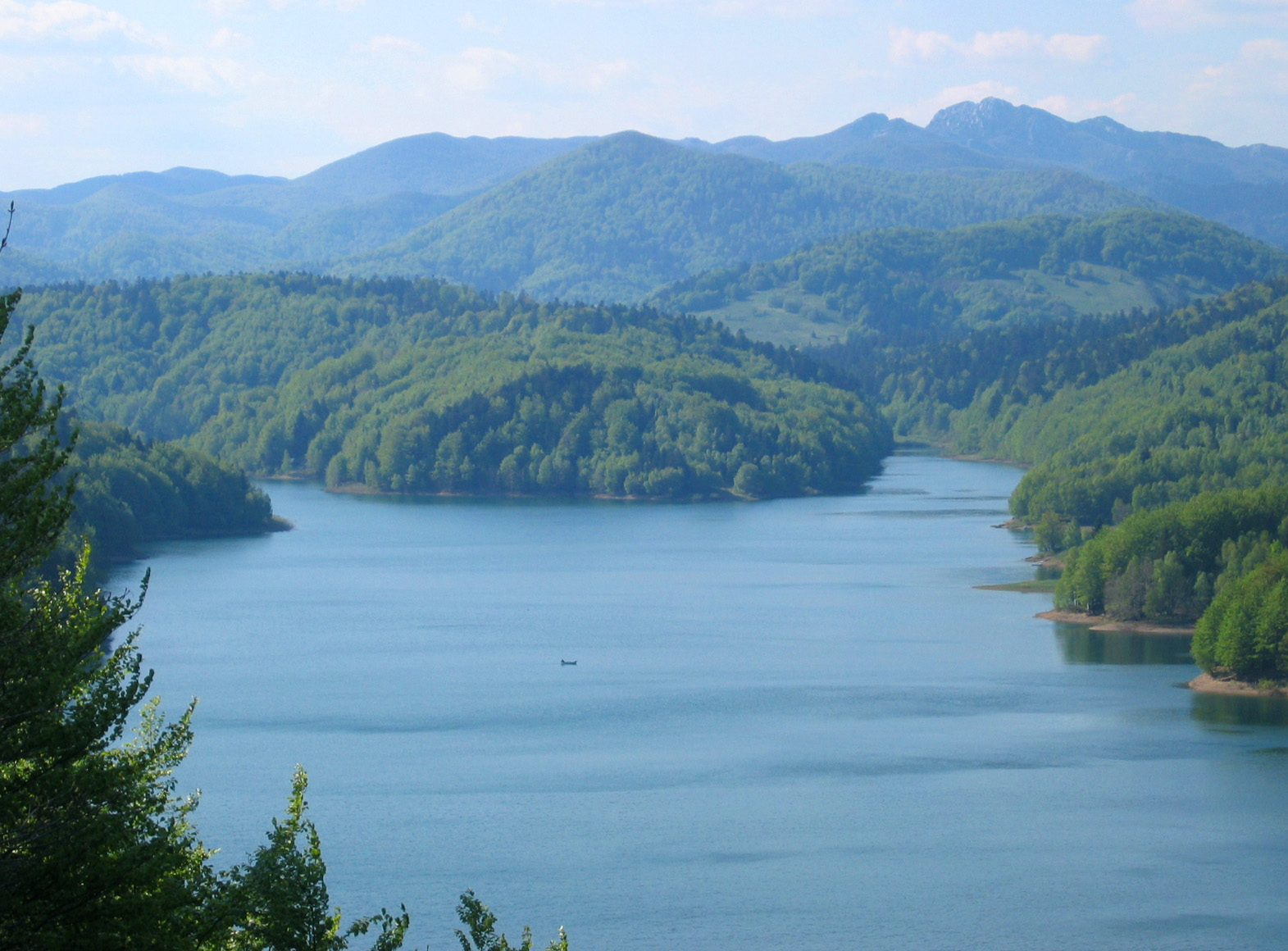
Lake Lokvarsko

This is a list of lakes in Croatia. The table lists some lakes with an area of 0.2 km^{2} or bigger, sorted by size.

Lake	County	Area km^{2}	Elevation m	Depth m
Lake Vrana (Dalmatia)	Zadar, Šibenik-Knin	30.7	0.1	4
Lake Dubrava*	Varaždin, Međimurje	17.1	138	n/a
Lake Peruča*	Split-Dalmatia	13.0	360	64
Lake Prokljan	Šibenik-Knin	11.1	0.5	25
Lake Varaždin*	Varaždin, Međimurje	10.1	158	n/a
Lake Vrana (Cres)	Primorje-Gorski Kotar	5.8	16	74
Lake Krušćica*	Lika-Senj	3.9	554	n/a
Lake Kopačevo	Osijek-Baranja	1.5–3.5	80	n/a
Lake Borovik*	Osijek-Baranja	2.5	n/a	n/a
Lake Butoniga*	Istria	2.5	n/a	7
Lake Lokve*	Primorje-Gorski Kotar	2.1	770	40
Mljet lakes (2 lakes)	Dubrovnik-Neretva	2.01	0	46
Plitvice lakes (16 lakes)	Lika-Senj	1.98	503–636	3–46
Baćina lakes (6 lakes)	Dubrovnik-Neretva	1.9	5	32
Lake Sabljaci*	Karlovac	1.2	320	6
Lake Bajer*	Primorje-Gorski Kotar	0.5	730	7
Lake Trakošćan*	Varaždin	0.2	255	n/a

(* denotes artificial lake)

== See also ==
- Lake Bačica
- Lake Banova
- Lake Baštica
- Lake Crveno
- Lake Kuti
- Lake Lepenica
- Lake Modro
- Lake Novska
- Lake Omladin
- Lake Ormož
- Lake Ričice
- Lake Šoderica
- Lake Tribalj
- Lake Zeleno
