= Josip Kazimir Drašković =

Croatian General (1716 - 1765)

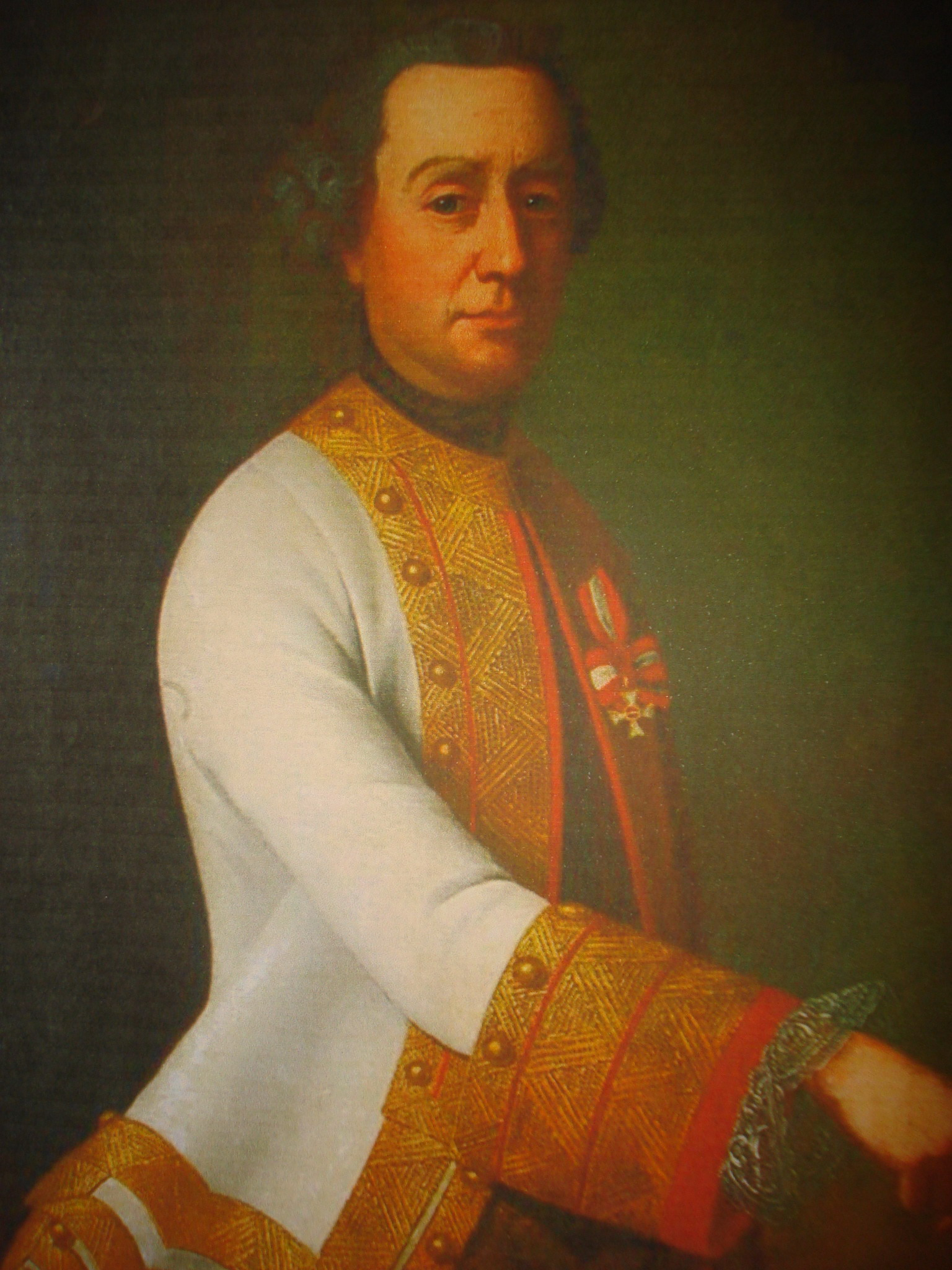
Josip Kazimir Drašković, Feldzeugmeister (three-star-general, commander of the artillery) in the Habsburg Monarchy imperial army

Josip Kazimir Drašković (1716–1765) was a Croatian general who played an important role in the Seven Years' War (1756–1763). He was Count of the noble House of Drašković (Draskovich).

From 1736 to 1739, Drašković took part in the war against the Ottomans, fighting in Serbia and Wallachia. In 1745, he became a lieutenant colonel in the 32nd Line Infantry Regiment of Forgách, with whom he successfully fought in Italy during the War of the Austrian Succession (1740-1748). He was promoted to colonel in 1749 and became general a year later. In the Seven Years' War he distinguished himself at the Battle of Lobositz on 1 October 1756 by successfully commanding the frontiersmen who held back the Prussians, and inflicted heavy losses on them.

He took part in the Battle of Prague on 6 May 1757. At the end of that year, on 5 December 1757, General Draskovic took part in the Battle of Leuthen. On 25 July 1760, during the capture of the Glatz Fortress, General Laudon's Austrian forces repelled the Prussians under General Fouqué towards Breslau, captured Landshut, and surrounded the fort. On 3 November that year Drašković fought in the battle of Torgau, and in 1761 he led his own corps in Upper Silesia with the task of protecting Moravia. In 1761, Drašković distinguished himself in capturing Schweidnitz. He was promoted to the rank of artillery general on 26 February 1763, and was awarded the Commander's Cross of the Order of Maria Theresa for his services throughout the war.

He is also noted for his love and marriage to a noblewoman of lower descent (Suzana Malatinski) which hurt his brilliant military career and made it impossible for him to advance socially, politically or militarily.

The couple had a chapel built on Trakošćan Castle grounds in 1754 which still stands that is consecrated to the Holy Cross. Trakoscan Castle is the ancestral home of the Draskovich family and was built in the Baroque Classicism style.

The Holy Mass was once celebrated four times a year, while today, apart from regular Sunday mass, the chapel also hosts traditional castle weddings.

Drašković died in the Klenovnik castle near Ivanec on 9 November 1765.
