= Veliki Bukovec Castle =

Castle in Veliki Bukovec, Varaždin County, Croatia

Coordinates: 46.28598°N 16.70763°E

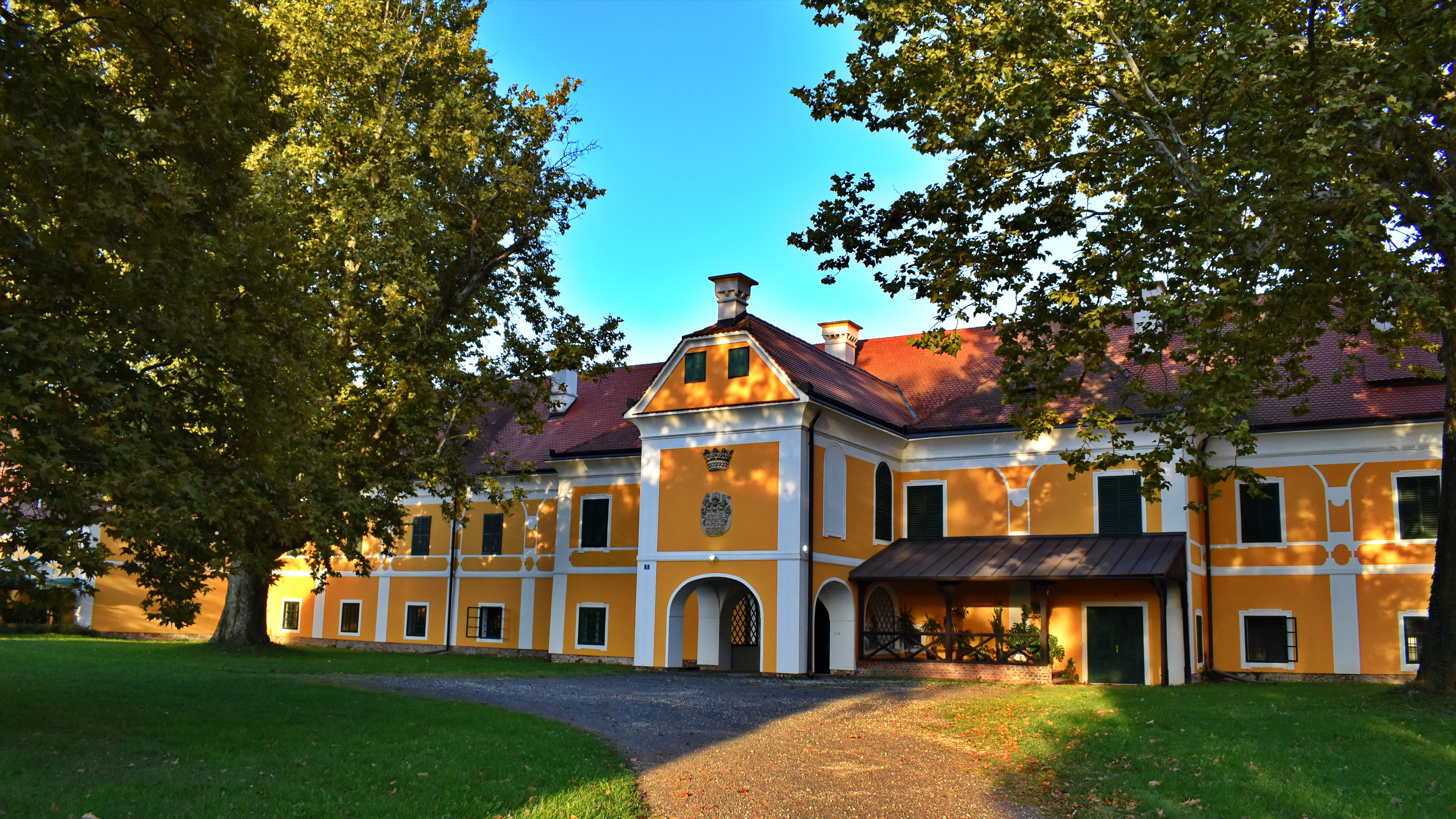
Veliki Bukovec Castle

Veliki Bukovec is a castle located in the municipality of the same name within Varaždin County, Croatia. The castle was built between 1745 and 1755 and has historically belonged to the House of Drašković.

During the course of World War II, castle owners Pavao and Eliza Drašković moved to Austria. The castle was nationalized in 1945 with the arrival of a communist regime in Yugoslavia. Karlo Drašković returned (together with his son Nikola) to the newly independent Croatia in the 1990s from his previous home in Güssing and had the castle ownership returned to him. In recent times, Karlo's grandson and Nikola's son, Ivan Alexander, often stays in the castle.
