= Olováry =

Village and municipality in Slovakia

Olováry Óvár
- Municipality
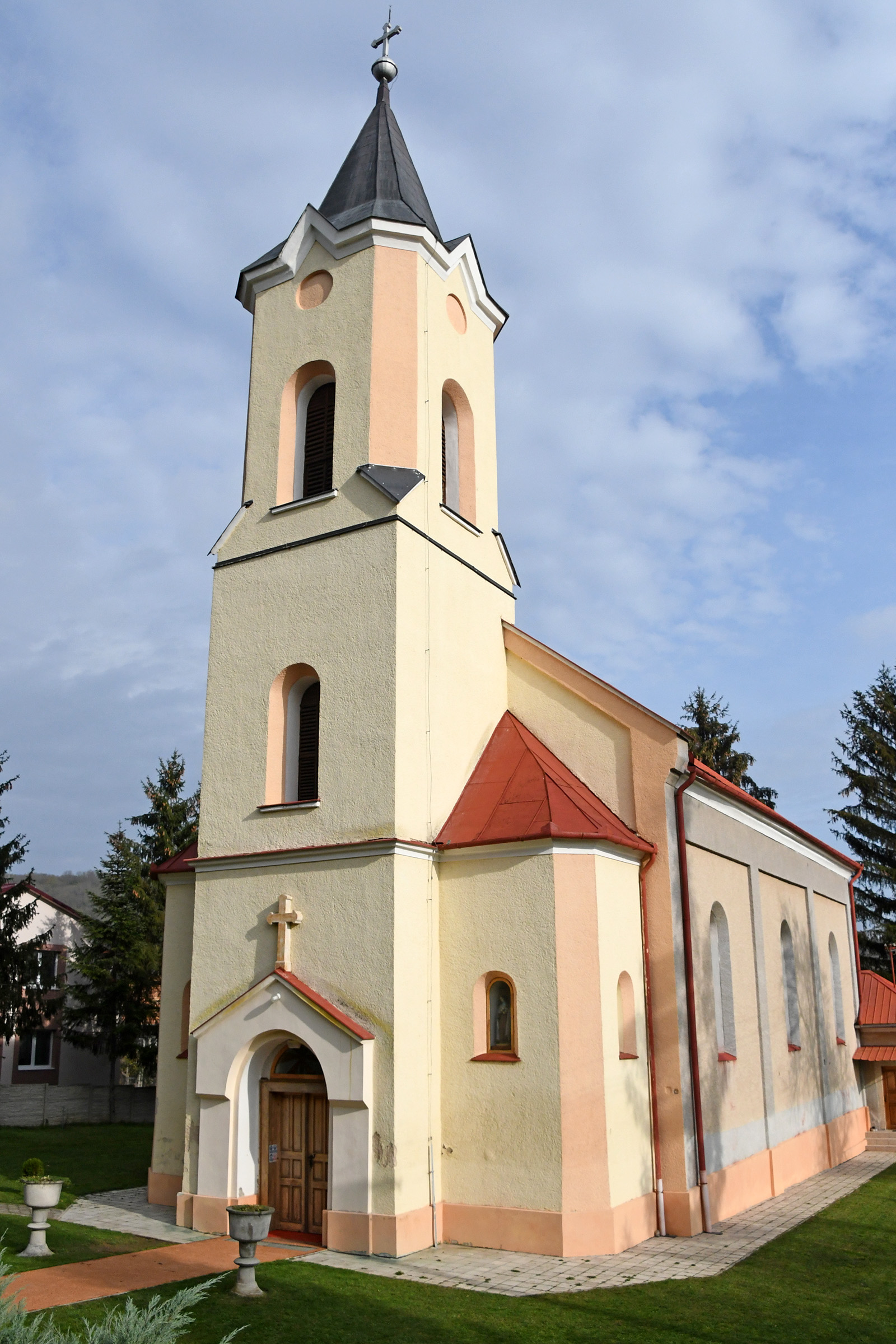

- Flag

- Location of Olováry in the Banská Bystrica Region Location of Olováry in Slovakia
- Coordinates: 48.15°N 19.42°E
- Country: Slovakia
- Region: Banská Bystrica Region
- District: Veľký Krtíš District
- First mentioned: 1245

Area
  - Total: 18.61 km^{2} (7.19 sq mi)
- Elevation: 190 m (620 ft)

Population (2025)
  - Total: 247
- Time zone: UTC+1 (CET)
  - Summer (DST): UTC+2 (CEST)
- Postal code: 991 22
- Area code: +421 47
- Vehicle registration plate (until 2022): VK
- Website: www.olovary.sk

Olováry (Hungarian: Óvár) is a village and municipality in the Veľký Krtíš District of the Banská Bystrica Region of southern Slovakia.

== Geography ==
The municipality lies at an altitude of 190 metres (620 ft) and covers an area of 18.61 km^{2} (7.19 sq mi) (2025).

== Population ==
Population statistic (10 years)
Year	1995	2005	2015	2025
Count	324	329	299	247
Difference		+1.54%	−9.11%	−17.39%

Population statistic
Year	2024	2025
Count	257	247
Difference		−3.89%

It has a population of 247 people (31 December 2025).

=== Ethnicity ===
Census 2021 (1+ %)
Ethnicity	Number	Fraction
Hungarian	194	74.61%
Slovak	80	30.76%
Total	260	

In year 2021 was 260 people by ethnicity 194 as Hungarian, 80 as Slovak, 2 as Romanian, 2 as Not found out and 1 as Other.

Note on population: The difference values of population numbers in the table "Population statistic" and in the sections "Ethnicity" & "Religion" is caused by the use of various statistical methods.

=== Religion ===
Census 2021 (1+ %)
Religion	Number	Fraction
Roman Catholic Church	226	86.92%
None	21	8.08%
Evangelical Church	8	3.08%
Total	260	

In year 2021 was 260 people by religion 226 from Roman Catholic Church, 21 from None, 8 from Evangelical Church, 2 from Not found out, 1 from Calvinist Church, 1 from Other and not ascertained christian church and 1 from Christian Congregations in Slovakia.
