= Drašković family =

Croatian noble family

Drašković
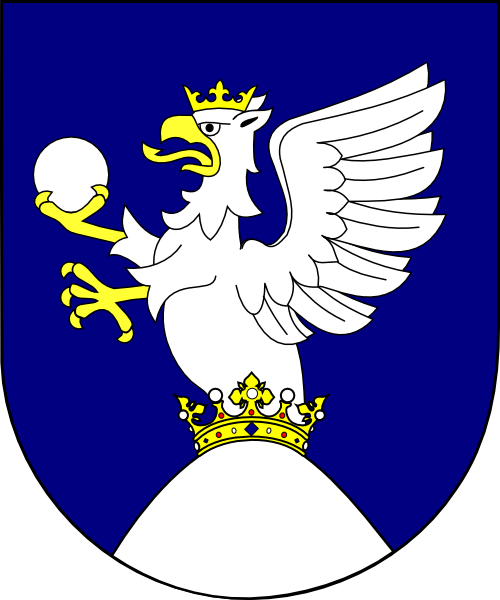
- Drašković coat of arms
- Country: Kingdom of Croatia
- Founder: Bartol Drašković
- Final ruler: Karl Drašković
- Titles: Baron (since 1567); Count (since 1631); Ban of Croatia

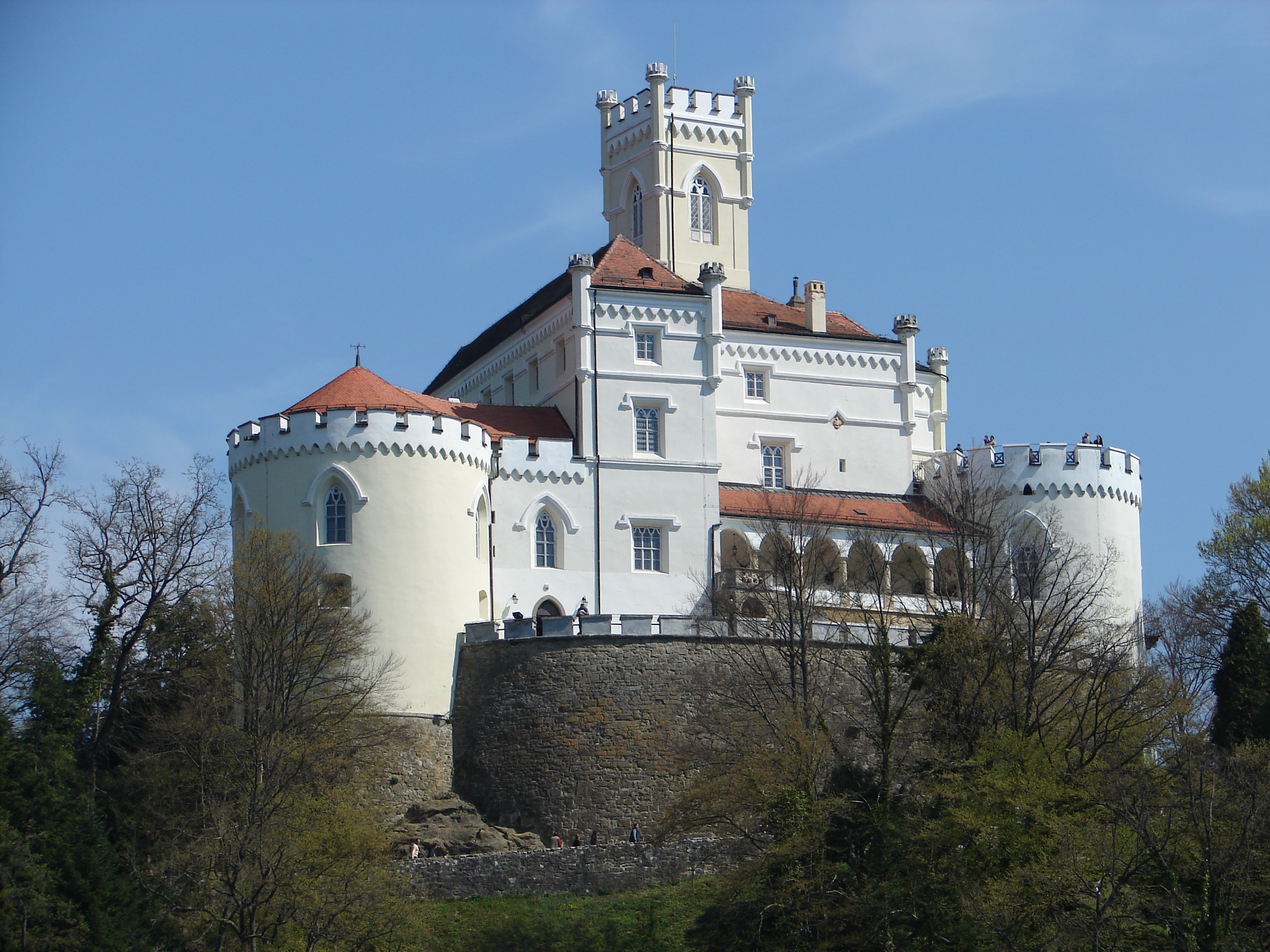
Trakošćan Castle

The House of Drašković (English: Draskovich), is a prominent Croatian noble family, supposedly descended from an old Croatian noble tribe of Kršelac, Stupić or Poletčić, while others considered the Mogorović family but it is less likely because they had a different coat of arms.

== History ==
There is no reliable data on the family before the 15th century. The first reliable information is provided by three documents written in Glagolitic alphabet in 1490 (mentioning "35 noblemen of the Drašković family" from 18 families), kept at the Budapest National Archives. In the 15th century, they owned an estate of Zažično in the Buška župa in Lika, and at Bilina near Knin in Dalmatia, which is why Bartol, who started the family's noble line, was in a document from 1520, referred to as "Kninjanin" ("from Knin"). His son Juraj was born in Bilina in 1525.

In the first half of the 16th century, due to the Turkish threat, Bartol moved to the Kupa river valley in Croatia proper. Juraj's younger brother Gašpar was made a baron in 1567 and given Trakošćan Castle in 1569. After that, the family members were referred to as "Trakošćanski" ("from or of Trakošćan").

The Drašković family also occupied the Klenovnik Castle, the largest in Croatia before renovating Trakošćan in the mid-19th century. Klenovnik still stands as a hospital.

== Notable members ==
From the 16th to the 20th century, several family members became renowned in Croatia as politicians, army leaders, religious dignitaries and the arts and literature.

- Juraj II Drašković (1525–1585) was trained for priesthood in Kraków, Vienna, Bologna, and Rome. He made a good career as a religious dignitary, and considerably added to the family fortune. In 1557, he was made bishop of Pécs and, in 1563, of Zagreb. As of 1576, he was the Croatian ban (Viceroy). By the end of his life, he was made a cardinal. He left behind several tractates, as well as a collection of sermons and speeches in manuscript.

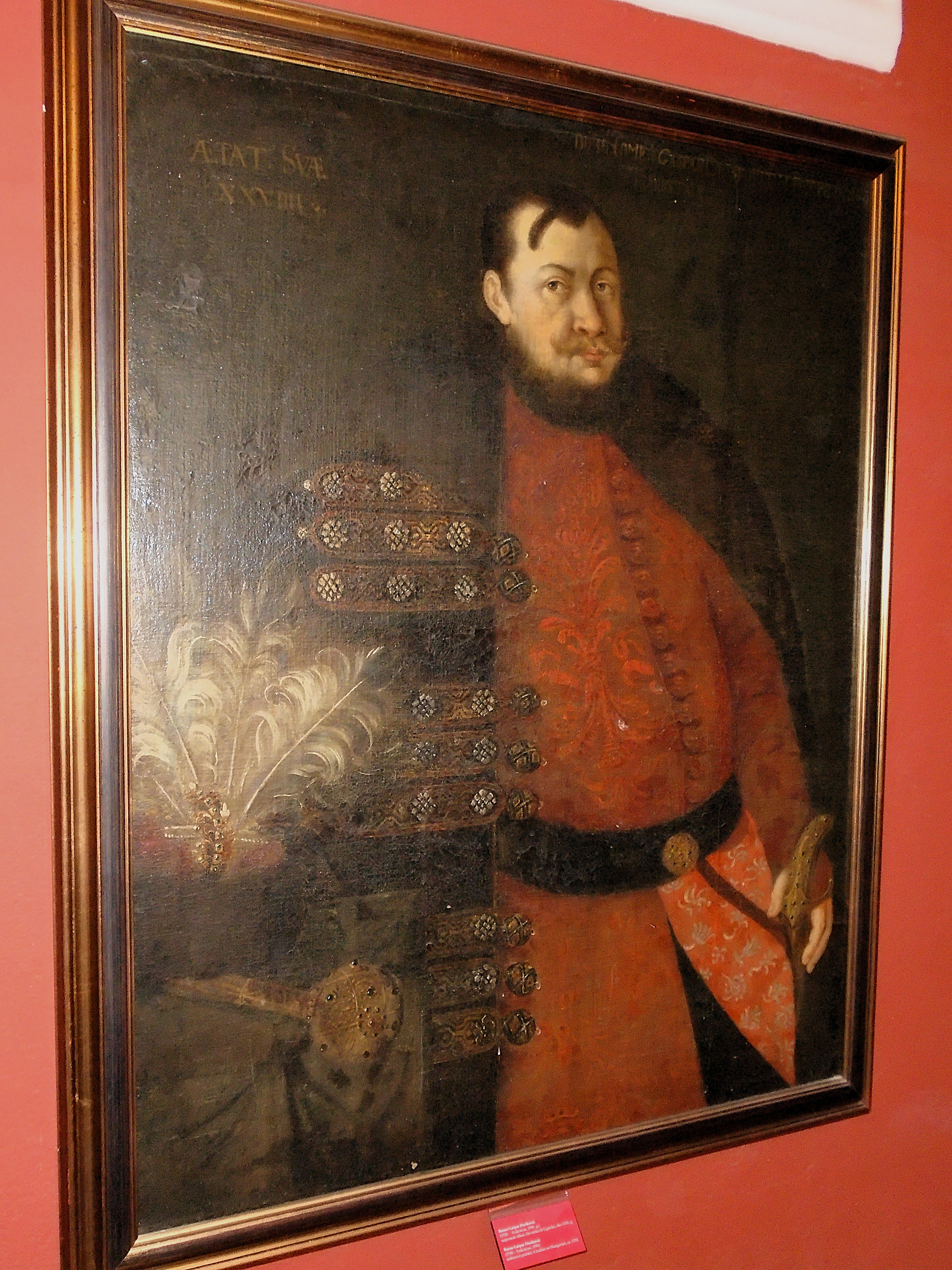
Portrait of Gašpar I Drašković in Trakošćan Castle

- Gašpar I Drašković, a younger brother of Juraj, received the title of "baron" in 1567 and Trakošćan Castle in 1569
- Ivan I Drašković, another younger brother of Juraj, was a commander of Croatian and Hungarian forces under the supreme command of Nikola IV Zrinski defending Szigetvár from the Turks in 1566.
- Ivan II Drašković was a nephew of Juraj and Ivan I, his mother was Caterina Székely, defended Turopolje from the Turks in 1570. He was the Ban of Croatia between 1595 and 1608.
- Ivan III Drašković (1603–1648). His mother was Éva Istvánffy. He studied philosophy in Graz and law in Bologna. In 1640, he became the Croatian viceroy (ban). He led victorious battles against the Turks, and was particularly concerned with fortifying burgs and Croatian military border fortifications, which is why he was called "defensor Croatiae". At the assembly held in 1646 in the Hungarian town of Pozsony (Požun in Croatian, now Bratislava in Slovakia), he was made the highest Hungarian national dignitary. He was the only Croatian who had this honour during the Habsburgs' rule.

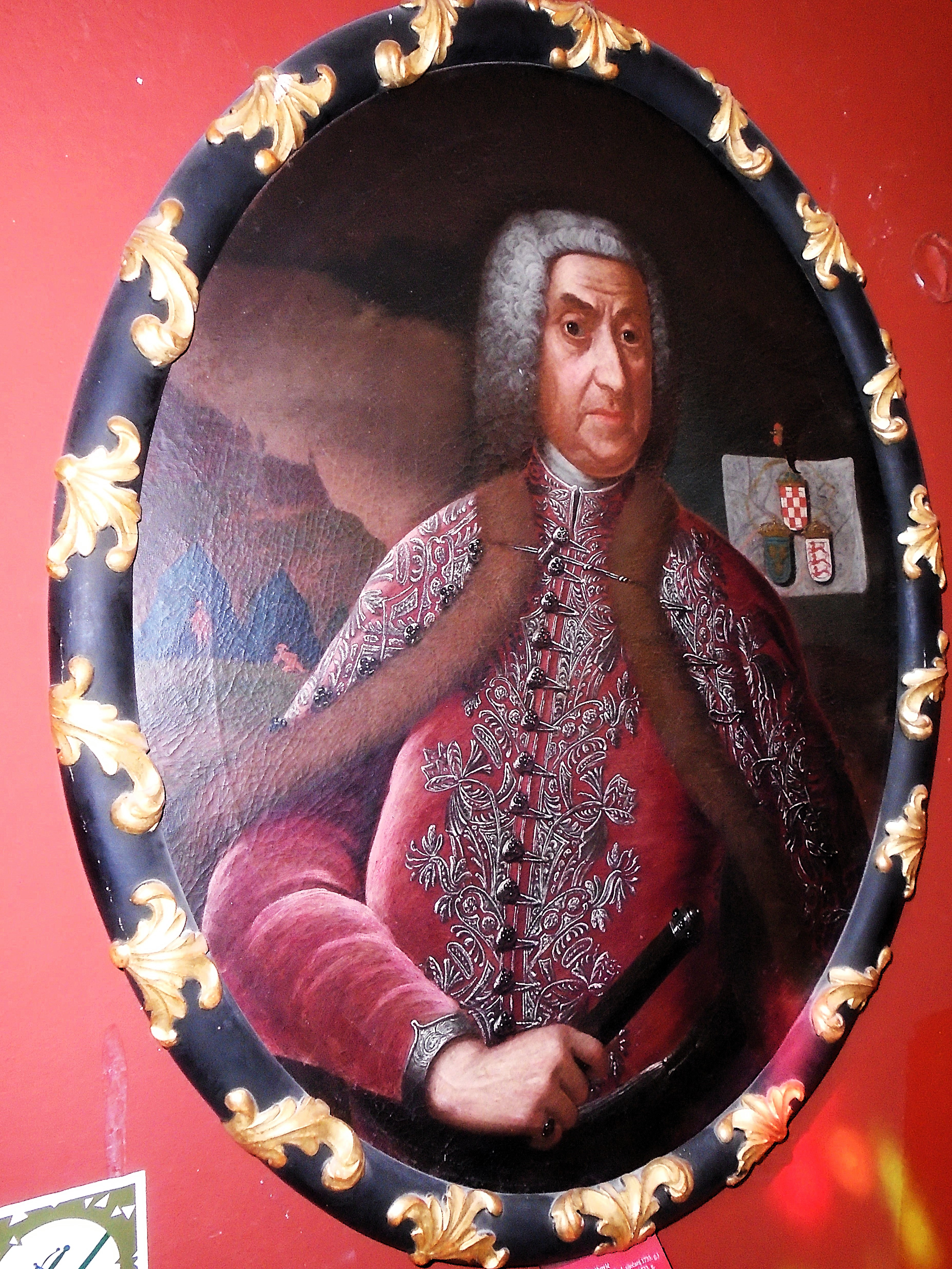
Portrait of Ivan V Drašković in Trakošćan Castle

- Ivan V Drašković, was Ban of Croatia from 17 February 1732 to his death on 4 January 1733.
- Josip Kazimir Drašković, general, was the son of Ban Ivan V Drašković. His marriage to a noblewoman of lower descent hurt his brilliant military career and made it impossible for him to advance as ban. He played a particularly important role in the seven-year war (1756–1763).
- Janko Drašković (1770–1856), was a national reformer and politician. He was very broadly educated, and even considered as the best educated person in Croatia at the turn of the 18th century. His best known piece is Disertacija or "Tractate", published in Karlovac in 1832. It was the first political pamphlet written in Štokavian dialect. Disertacija is the political, economic, and cultural programme of the Illyrian movement. In 1842, he gave a programmatic speech on the occasion of Matica ilirska's (the local cultural and publishing society's) establishment, as its first chairman. He dedicated all of his energy to his political activity and to the battle against pro-Hungarians. His Disertacija was translated into German in 1834. He also wrote poetry.
- Juraj V Drašković, as Major-General, he fought with Radetzky, and later also with Ban Jelačić. He was an MP, and one among the founders of the then Yugoslav Academy of Sciences and Arts. He started making calotypes already in 1848, his collection being one among the earliest and best preserved of its kind in the country.
- Karlo Dragutin Drašković (1873–1900) was an amateur photographer. After finishing high school in Zagreb, he studied law and technology in Budapest. He became engaged in photography in 1892. In 1895, he became a member of the Wiener Camera Club. There are several hundred of his negatives, prints, and slides preserved from the 1894-1899 period. Particularly interesting are those recording fast movements. He was one among the most pronounced 19th-century amateur photographers.
- Julijana Drašković (1847–1901), her paintings may today be found mostly in Trakošćan. Along with her brothers Rudolf and Stjepan, and son Karlo, she was also engaged in amateur photography.
- Maria Drašković of Trakošćan (1904–1969) was the first wife of Albrecht, Duke of Bavaria, head of the House of Wittelsbach and pretender to the Kingdom of Bavaria from 1955 to 1996, as well the jacobite pretender to the thrones of England, Scotland, Ireland, and France. She was the mother of Franz, Duke of Bavaria and Max, Duke in Bavaria. She was a descendant of Marie-Louise of Austria, Empress of The French, second wife of Napoleon, through her mother Princess Juliana von Montenuovo (1880–1961).

== See also ==
- List of titled noble families in the Kingdom of Hungary

== Sources ==
- Jurković, Ivan (2006). "Osmanska ugroza, plemeniti raseljenici i hrvatski identitet". Povijesni Prilozi. 25 (31): 39–69.
