= Trakošćan Castle =

- Dvorac Trakošćan (Croatian)
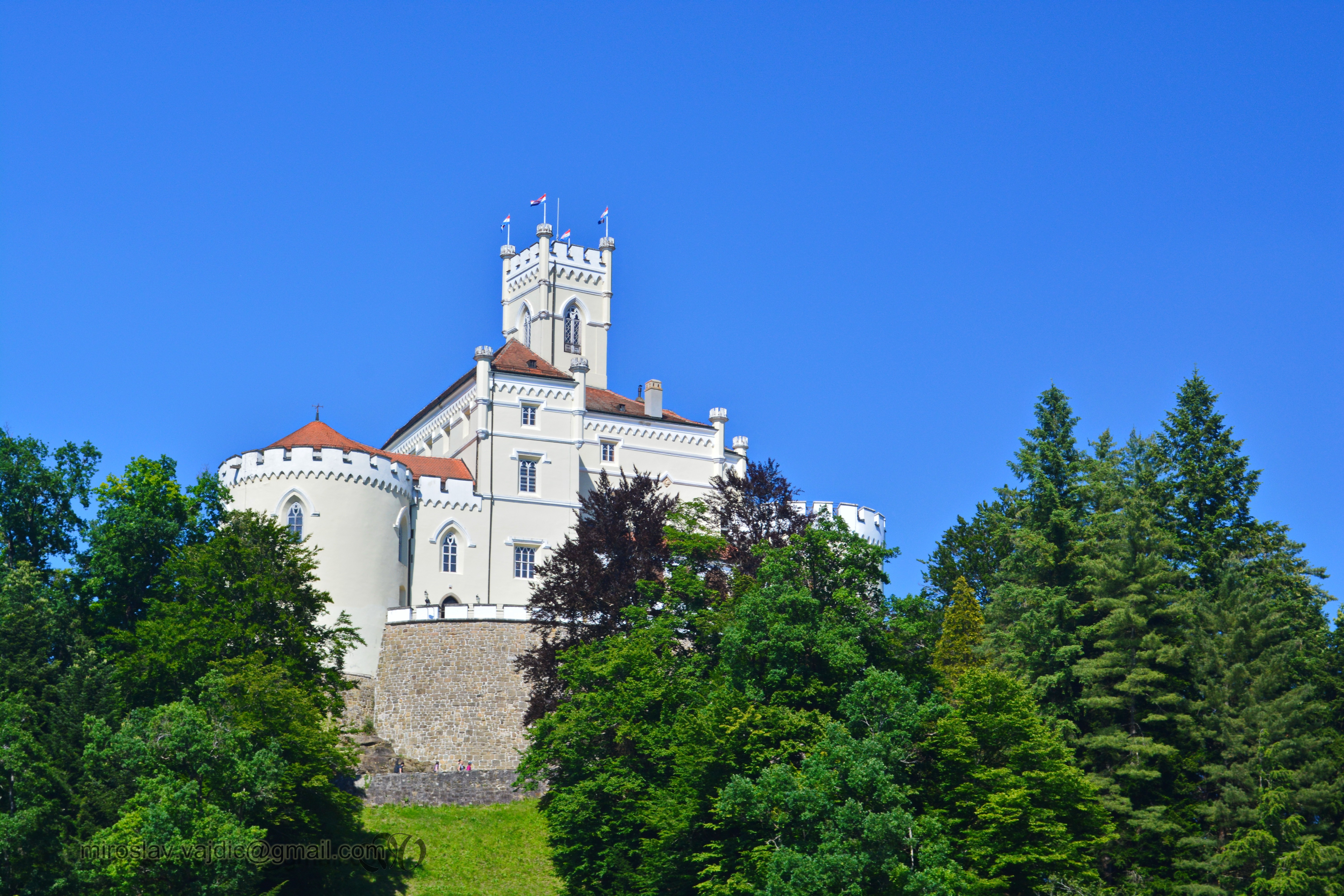

- Location within Croatia
- 46°15′29.4″N 15°56′49.12″E
- Location: Near Bednja, Croatia

Site notes
- Area: 87 ha (210 acres)
- Architectural style: Castle

Cultural Good of Croatia
- Official name: Dvorac Trakošćan
- Type: Cultural
- Designated: April 9, 2003
- Reference no.: RZG-563

Trakošćan Castle (pronounced [trakɔʃtɕan], Croatian: Dvorac Trakošćan) is a castle located in northern Croatia (in Varaždin County) that dates back to the 13th century (although the first written mention of the toponym "Trakošćan" is dated to 1334).

Trakošćan Castle is considered the best preserved and one of the most beautiful castles in Croatia.

== History ==
Trakošćan was built in the 13th century within Croatia's northwestern fortification system, as a rather small observation fortress for monitoring the road from Ptuj to Bednja Valley.

According to a legend, Trakošćan was named after another fortification (arx Thacorum) that was alleged to have stood in the same spot back in antiquity. Another source claims that it was named after the knights of Drachenstein who were in control of the region in early Middle Ages.

The toponym was first mentioned in written records in 1334. It is not known who its owners were in the first years of its existence. As of the end of the 14th century, it was owned by the Counts of Celje, who were in charge of all of Zagorje County. The family soon became extinct, and Trakošćan shared the fate of their other burgs and estates that were divided and kept changing owners. In these divisions, Trakošćan was, as a whole, first owned by an army leader by the name of Jan Vitovac, then by Ivaniš Korvin, who gave it to his deputy warden Ivan Gyulay. The family kept the castle throughout three generations, and became extinct in 1566, after which the ownership was taken over by the state.

King Maximilian gave the estate to Juraj Drašković (1525–1587) for services rendered, first personally, and then as family heritage. This was how, in 1584, the Drašković family finally came into possession of Trakošćan.

In the second half of the 18th century, when the building of manors was flourishing in Hrvatsko Zagorje, Trakošćan was abandoned. Neglected, it fell quickly into dilapidation. It was only towards the middle of the 19th century that the family became interested once again in its estate, in the Romanticist spirit of return to nature and family traditions. In this spirit, the deputy marshal Juraj V. Drašković turned the castle into a residential manor-house, while the surrounding park was turned into Romanticist pleasure grounds. The generations that followed were staying at the castle from time to time all the way until 1944 when they were forced to emigrate to Austria. Soon after that, the castle became nationalized.

The Museum with collections on permanent display was established in 1953. The castle is today owned by the Republic of Croatia.

The castle itself reveals different phases of building. For several centuries, it used to be a fortification, so that the reconstructions undertaken during that period were functional rather than aesthetic. The facility's essential core is a Romanesque fortification consisting of a housing unit, a small fortified yard, and a massive high tower. The fortification's good location and its observation tower made it safe and easy to defend.

Rapid development of firearms and increasingly threatening Turkish attacks made additional construction and further fortifying urgently necessary. The Drašković family's second generation, Ivan II and Petar, added the western tower, which may be seen from the coat-of-arms and the accompanying inscription.

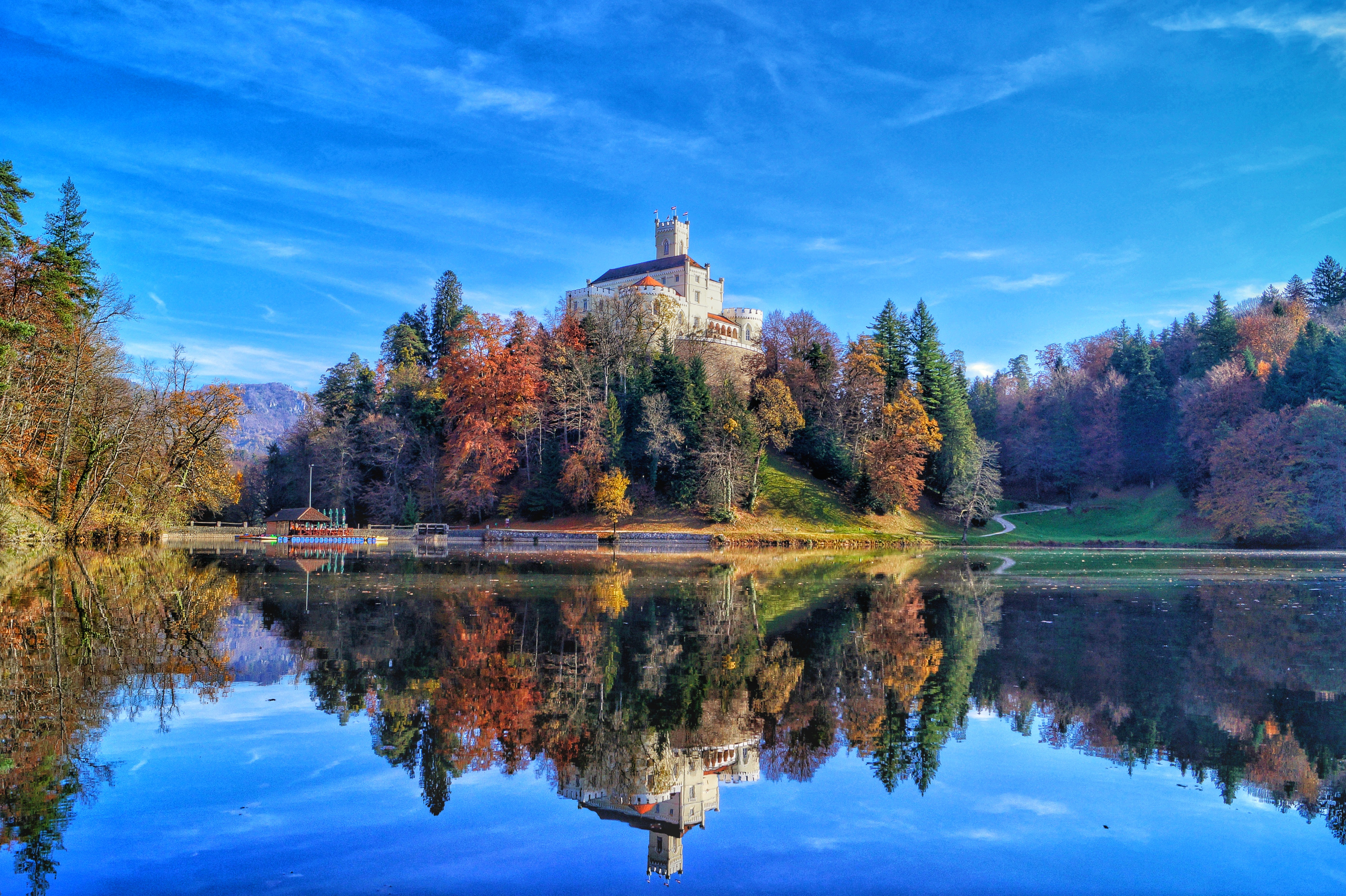
The Trakošćan Castle on Lake Trakošćan

On the Great Genealogical Tree, the oldest visual presentation from 1668, the facility had three floors, and its basic dimensions could already be discerned. Over the next period, several defense facilities were added around it. At the time, it also had the highest number of inhabitants, as may be seen from the Small Genealogical Tree dating back to 1755. It was in this same century that the outbuildings were erected at the foothills of Trakošćan, and a stone bridge built over the river Bednja.

In the 19th century Trakošćan acquired its present appearance. In the 1840–62 period, during one among the first restoration undertakings in the country, the castle was reconstructed in Neo-Gothic style. This not only altered its exterior, but also finally brought to an end its five centuries long fortification purpose. The reconstruction of the castle was begun in 1853 by Juraj IV Drašković and his wife Sofija née Baillet-Latour, with a completely new appearance after 3 years. The reconstruction also included the appearance of Romanticist pleasure grounds, after the model of English parks. When the dam was built, the valley turned into a large lake. The uniqueness of style characterizing the facility equally includes the interior and its surrounding landscape. Count Drašković sold Klenovnik Castle, the largest castle in Croatia, then also held by the Draskovich Family in order to fund the restorations.

After the reconstruction, the castle was still inhabited by several generations of the Drašković family that did some additional constructions and adaptations. It was at the time that the northern tower appeared over the entrance, a large shingle cap added to the top of the tower (removed in 1961), and a southwestern vaulted terrace added. Environment of the Trakošćan was made in accordance with the plan of Franz Risig (1814-1896) and also can be considered an important factor of cultural heritage.

The end of World War II found Trakošćan in a neglected and dilapidated condition, which is why protective architectural and interior decoration works were immediately undertaken. Over the past few years, the castle has once again been undergoing more thorough reconstruction.

== Gallery ==
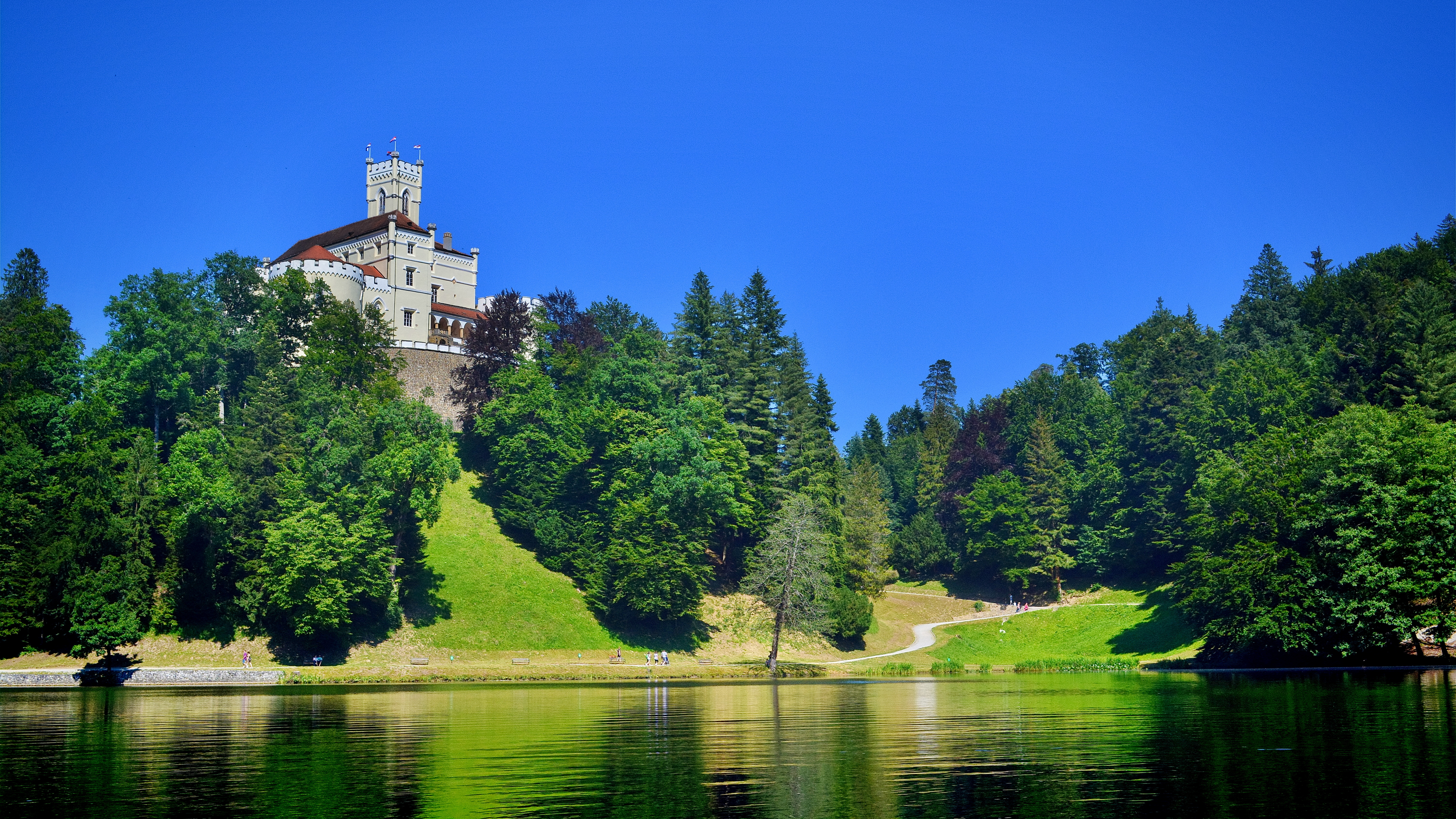

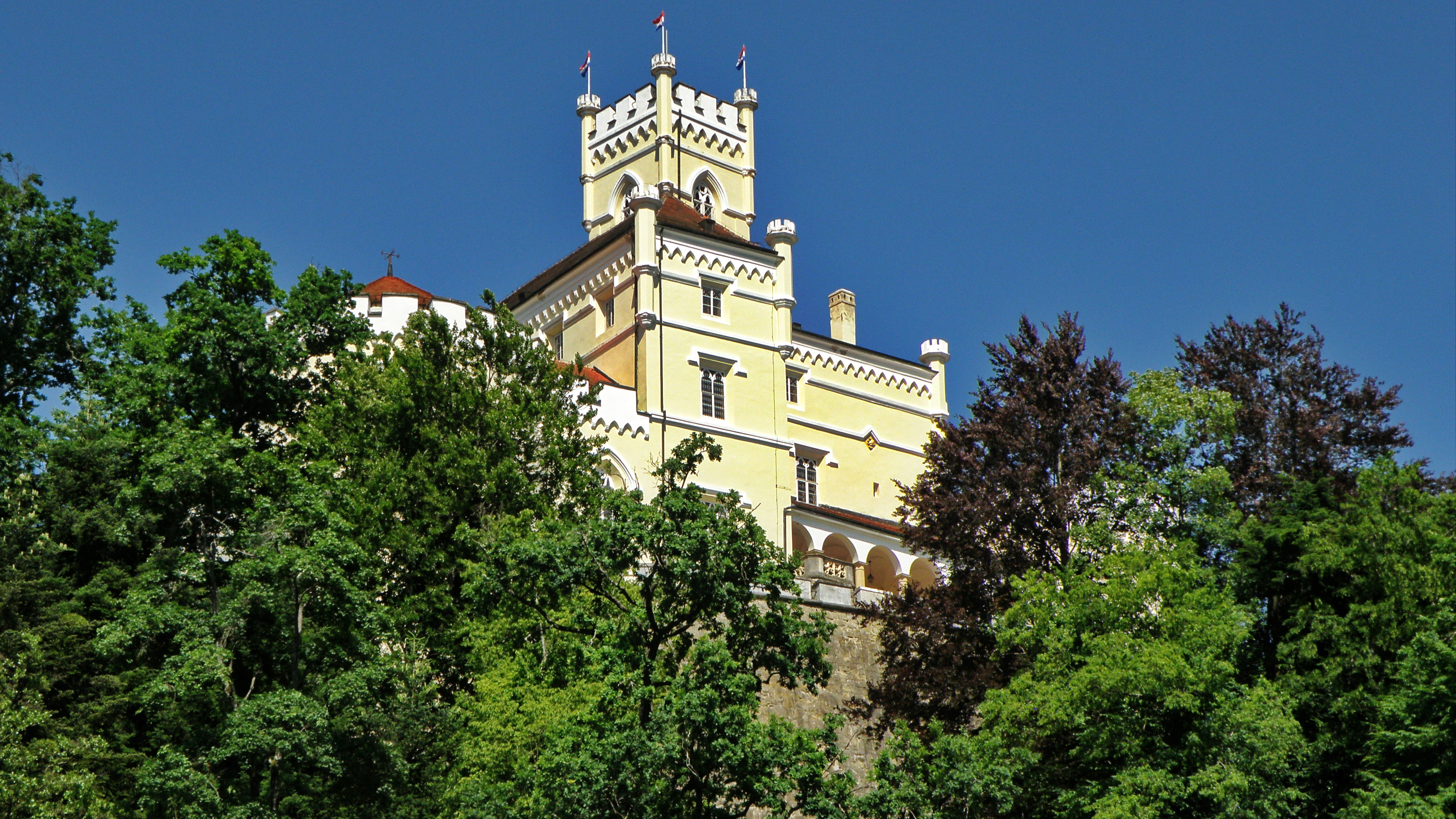

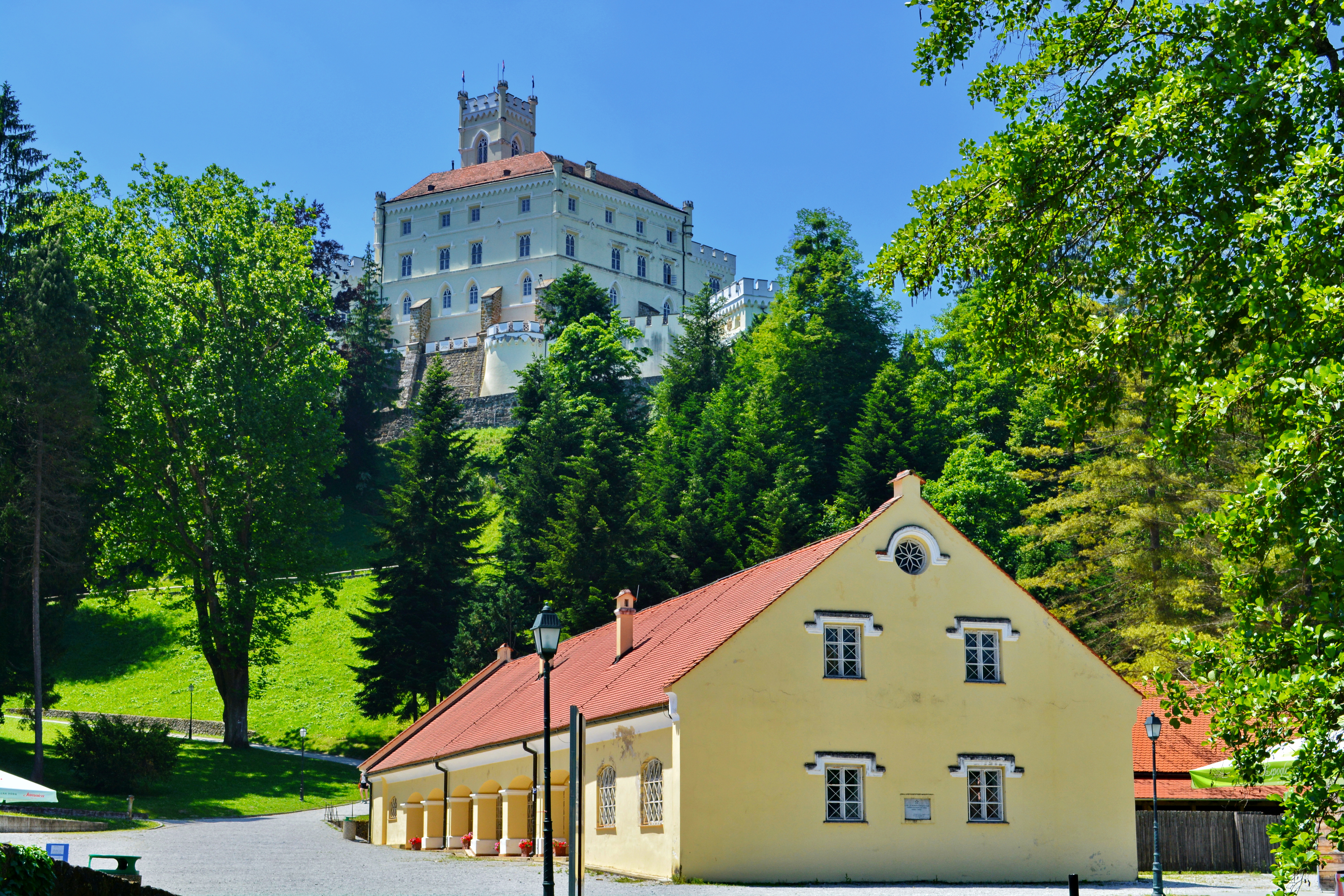

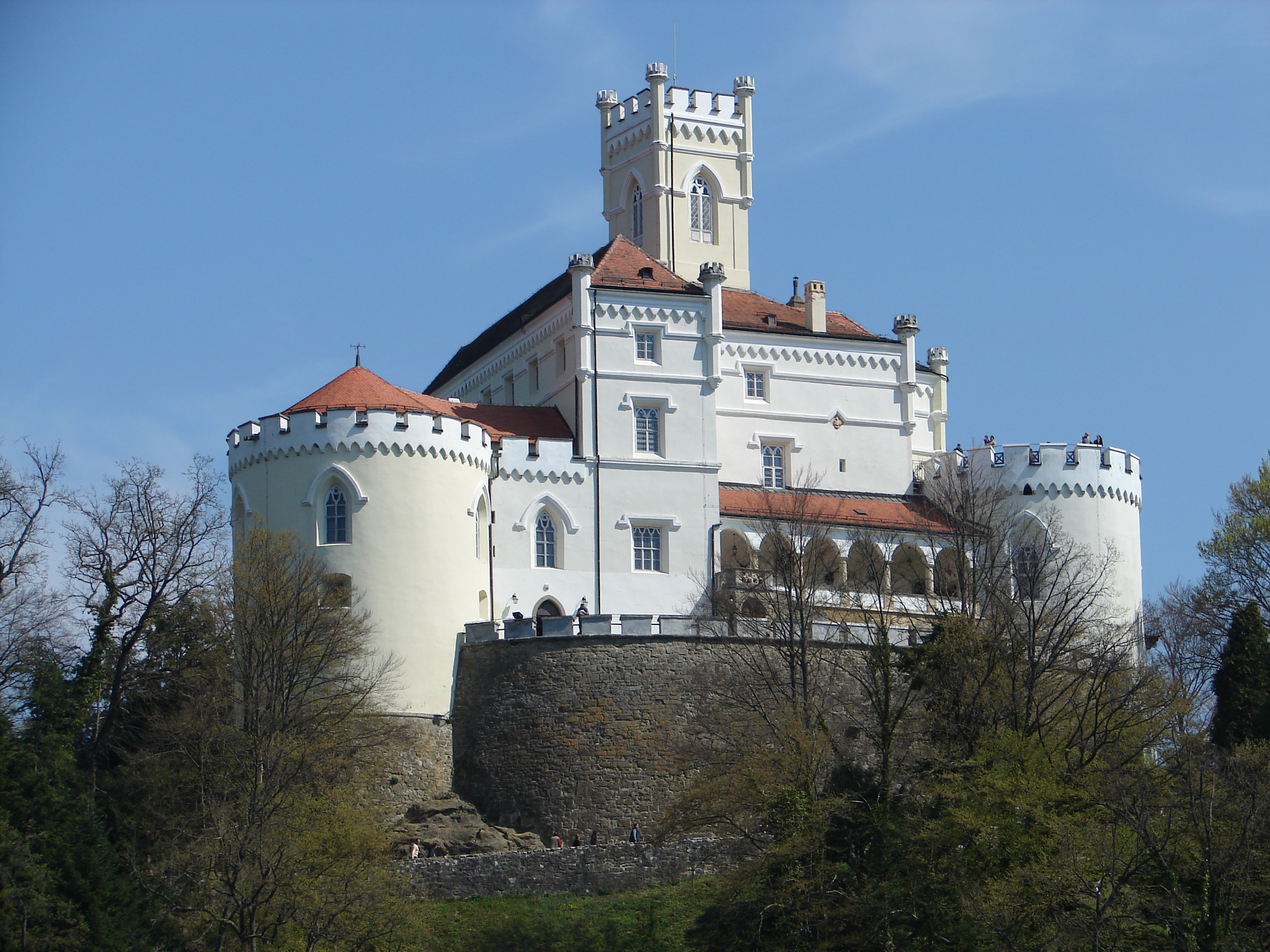

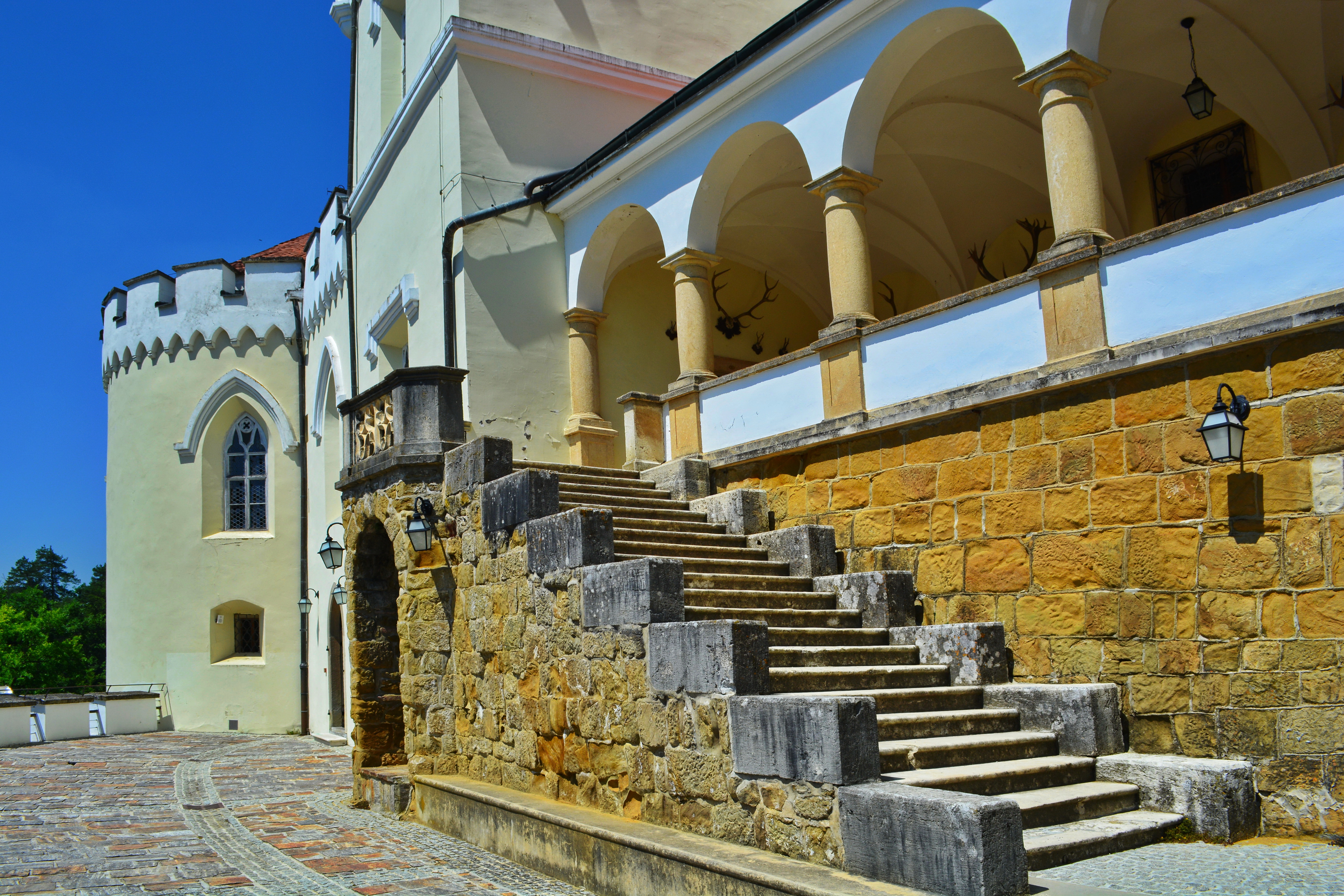

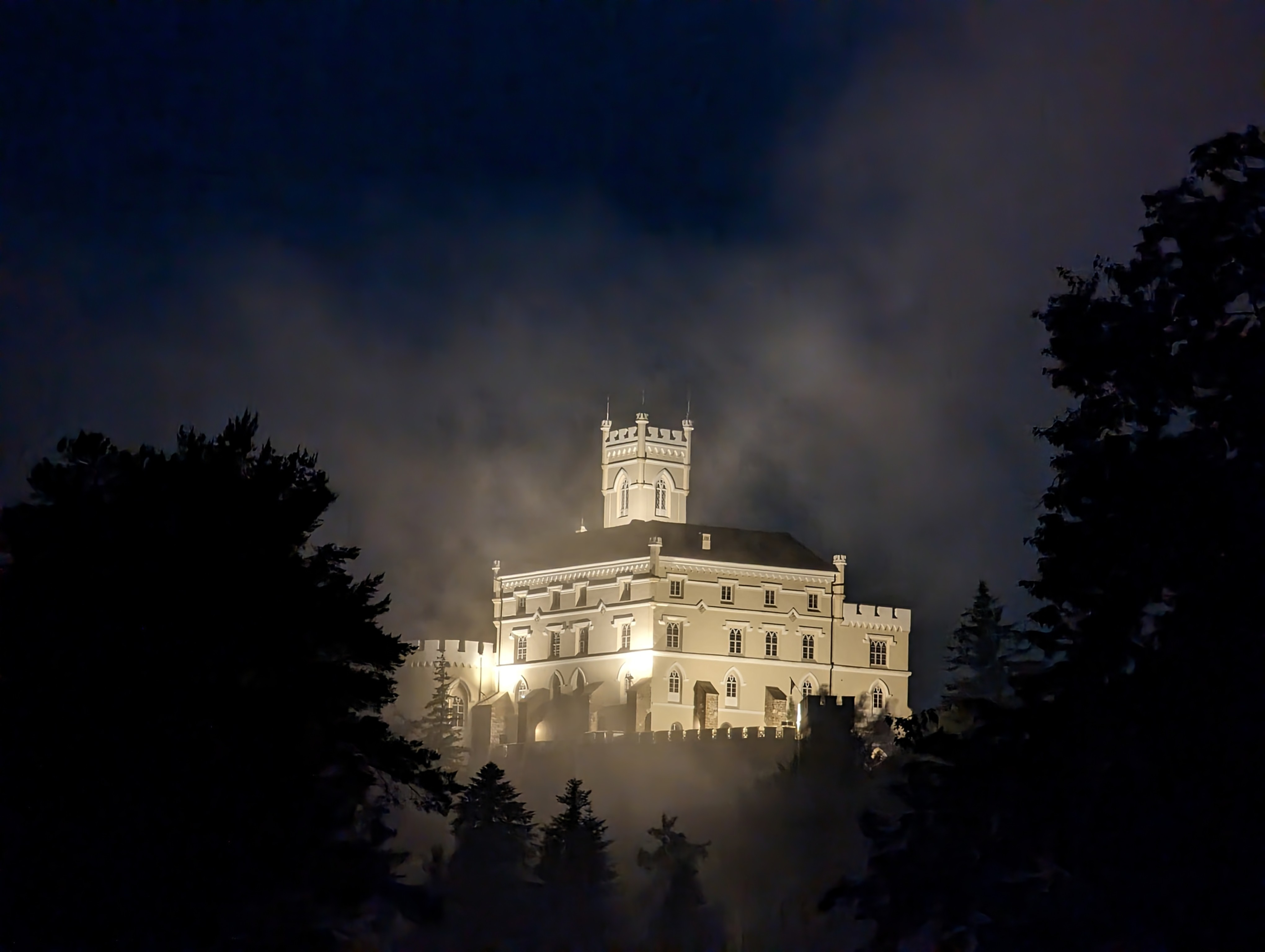

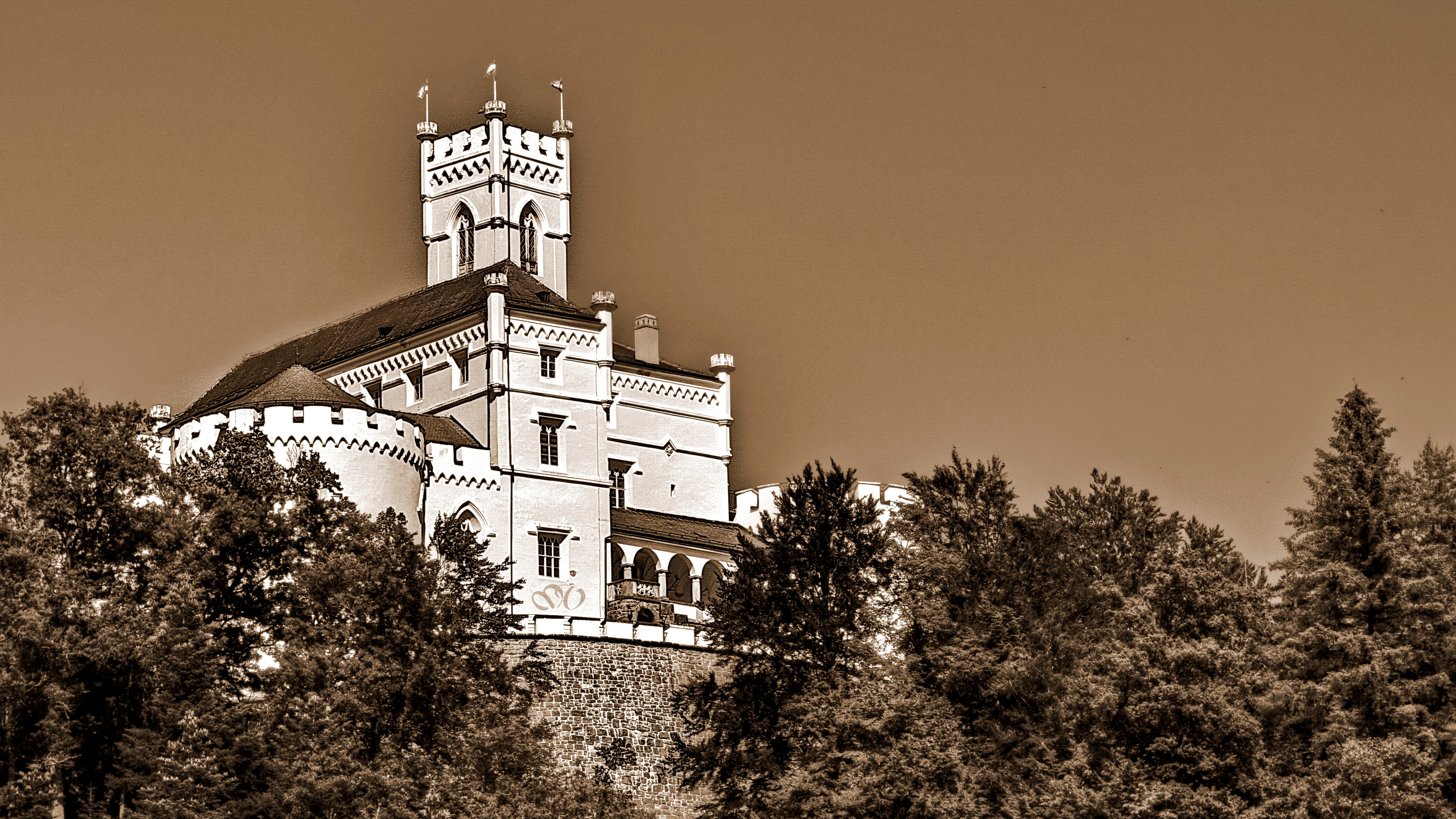

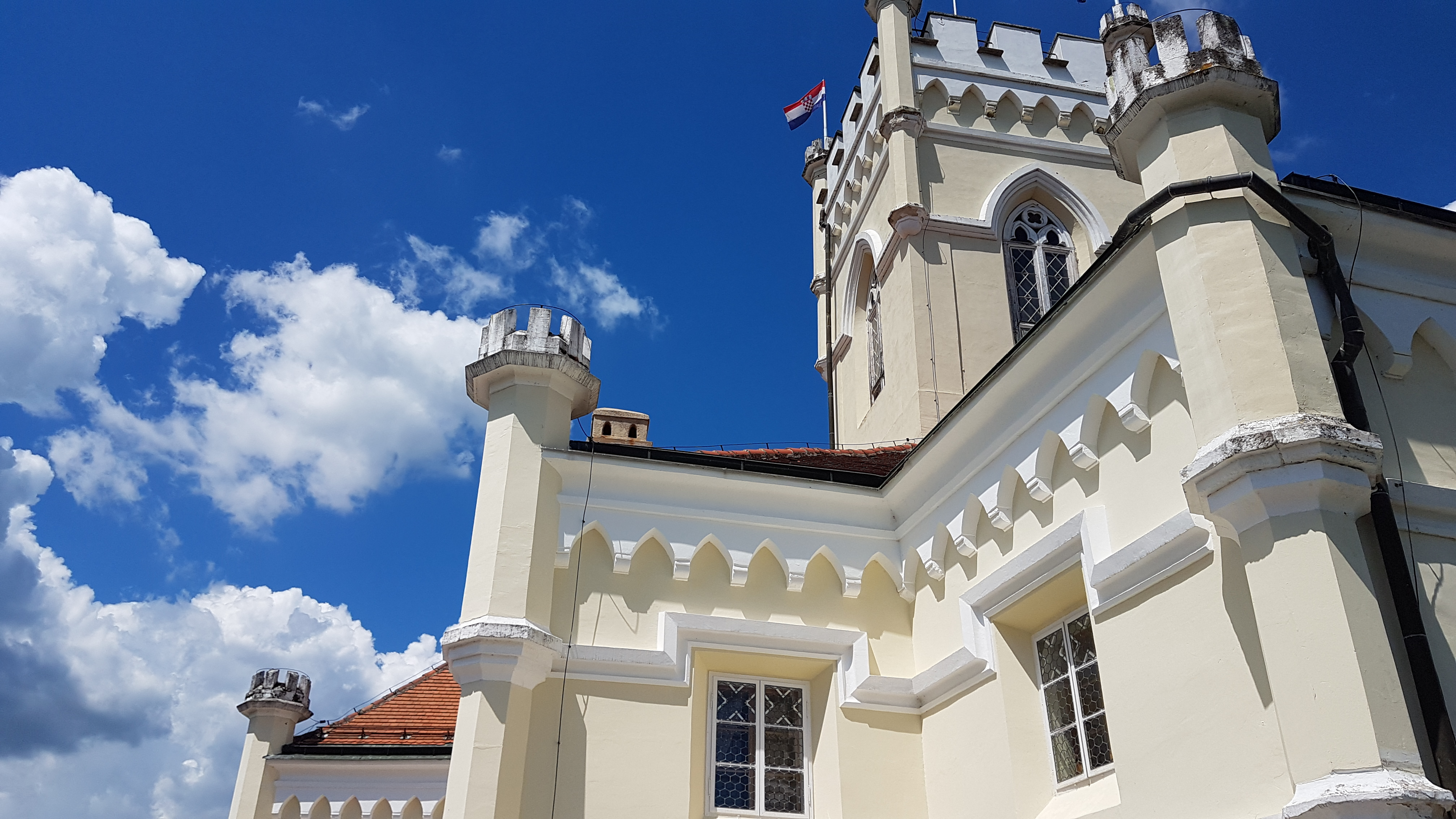

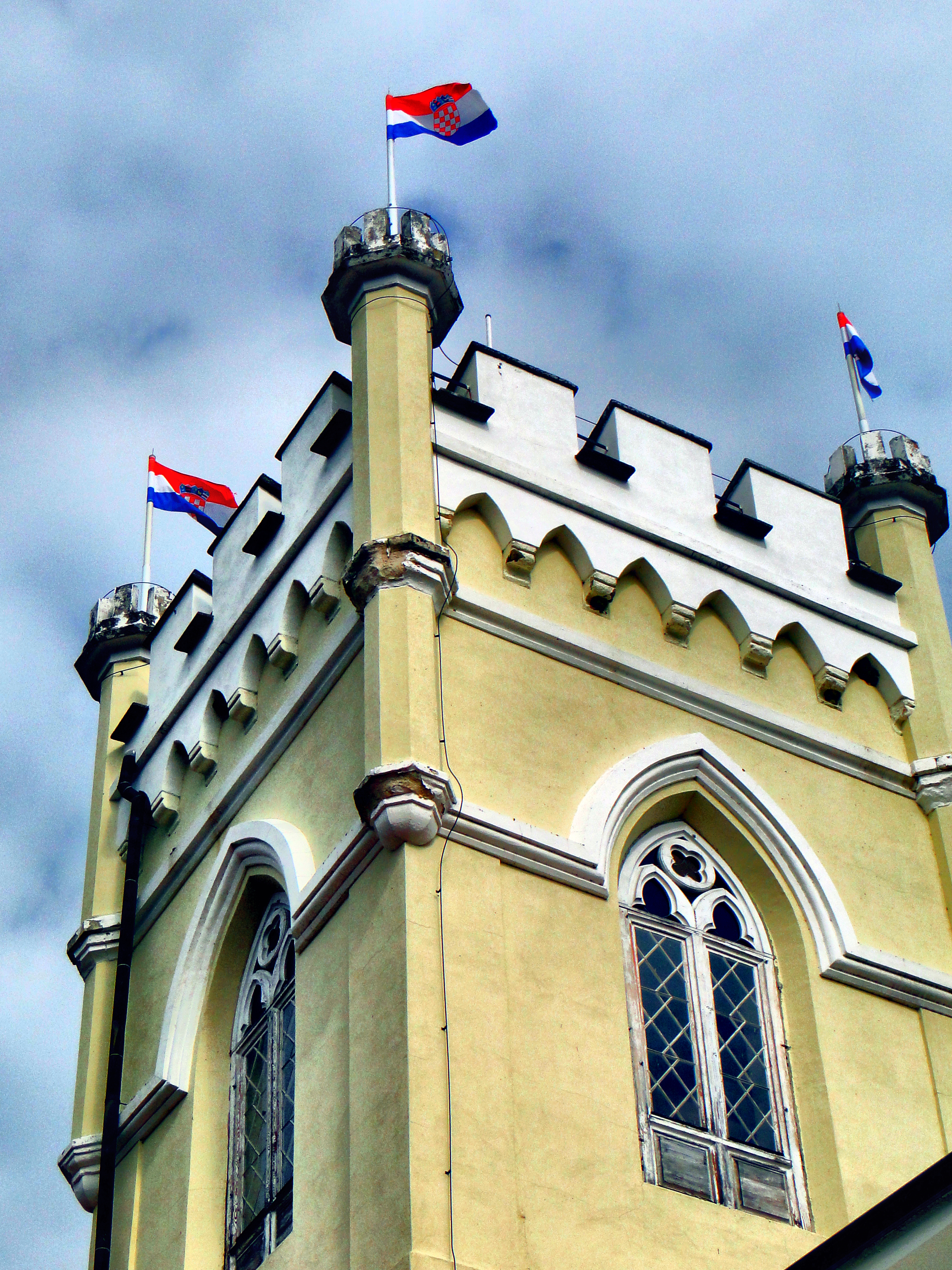

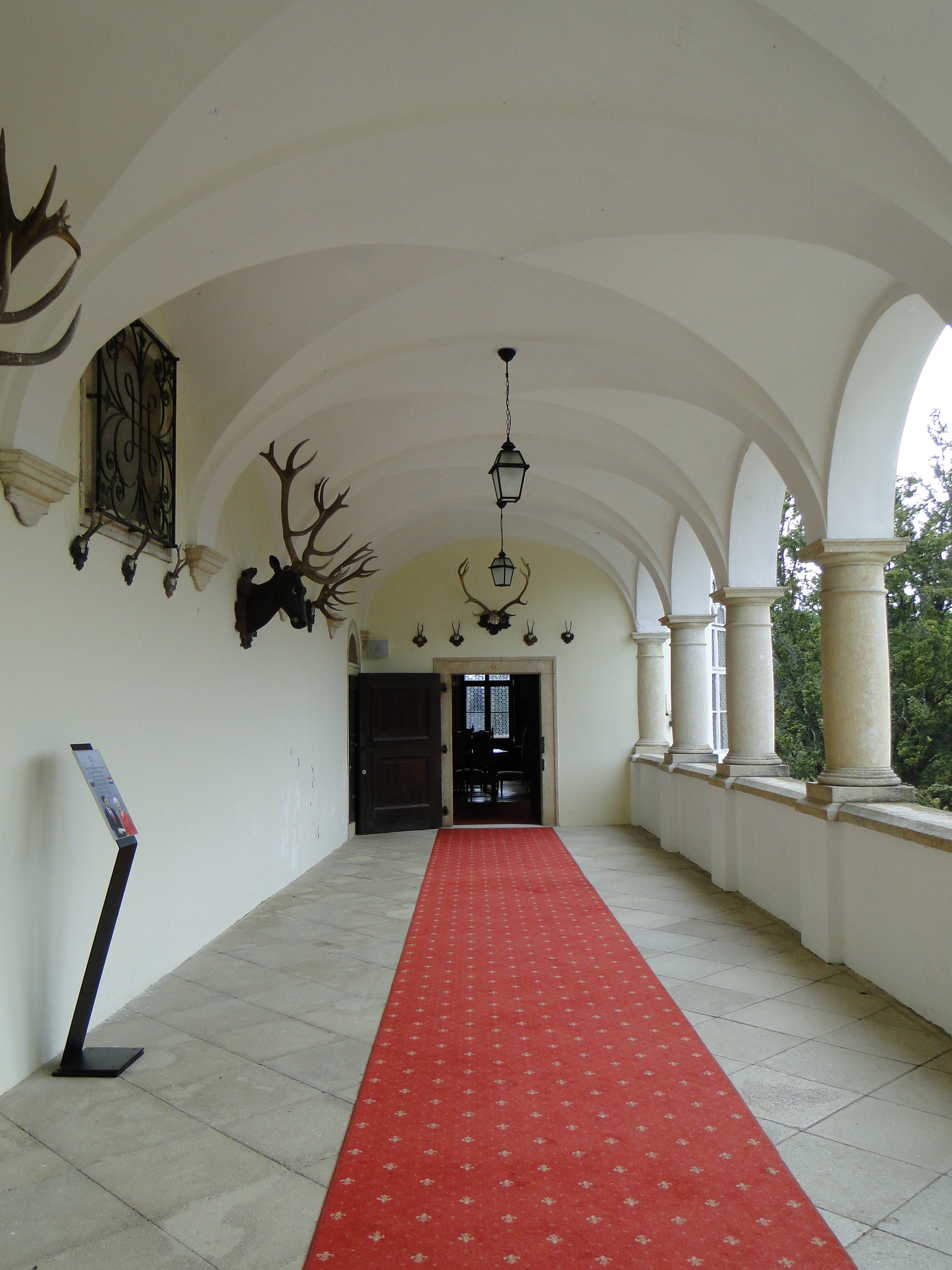

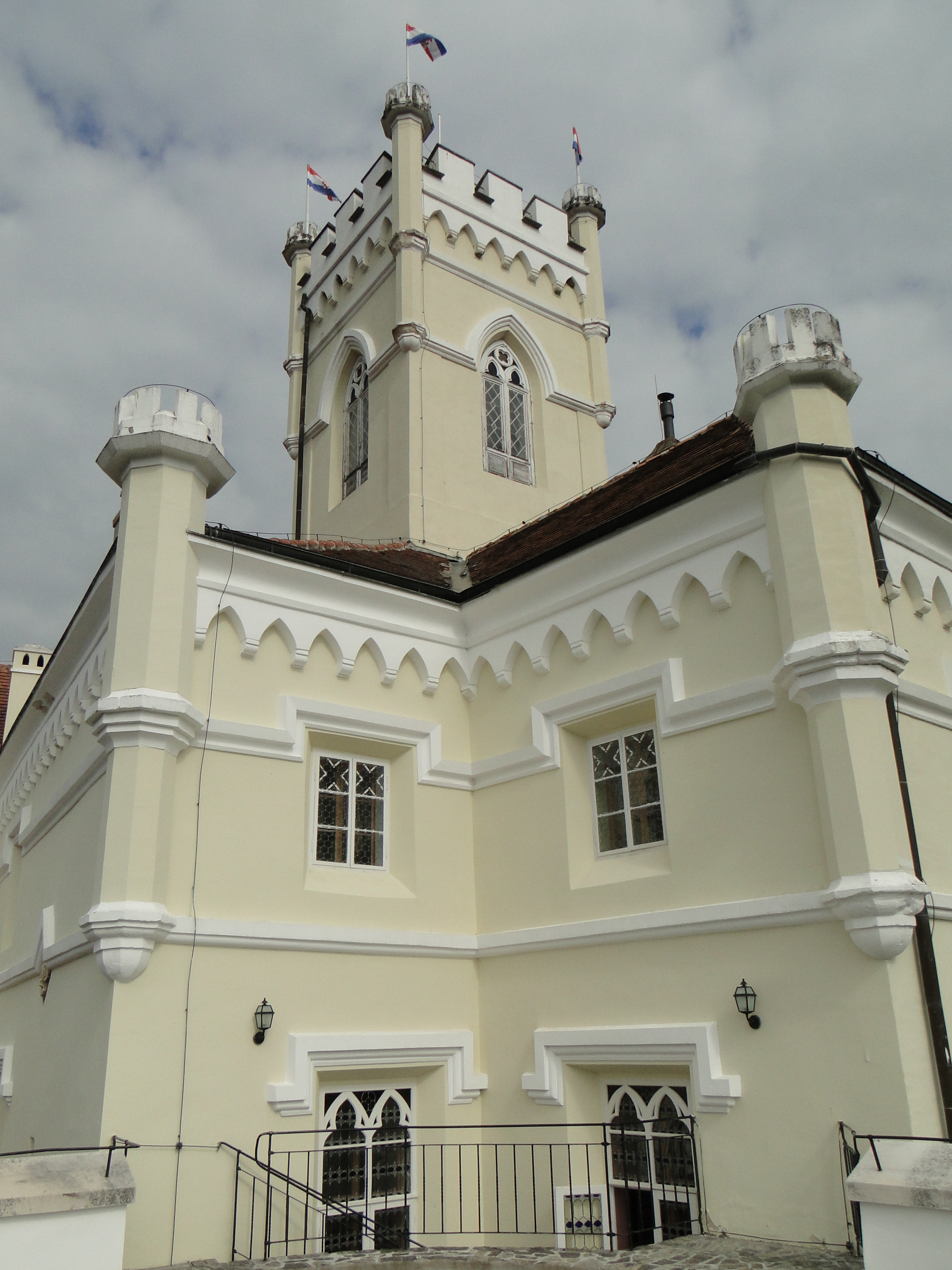

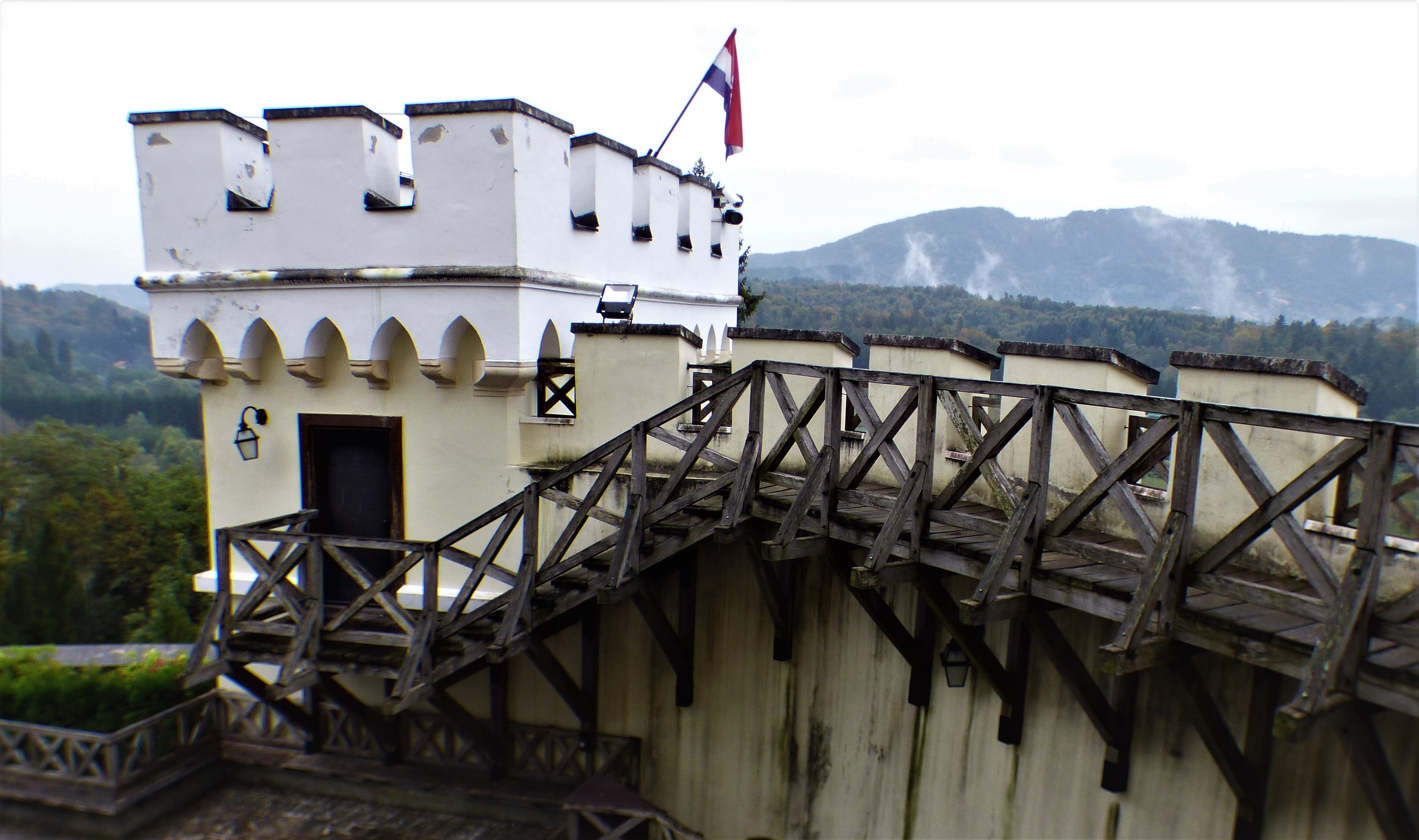

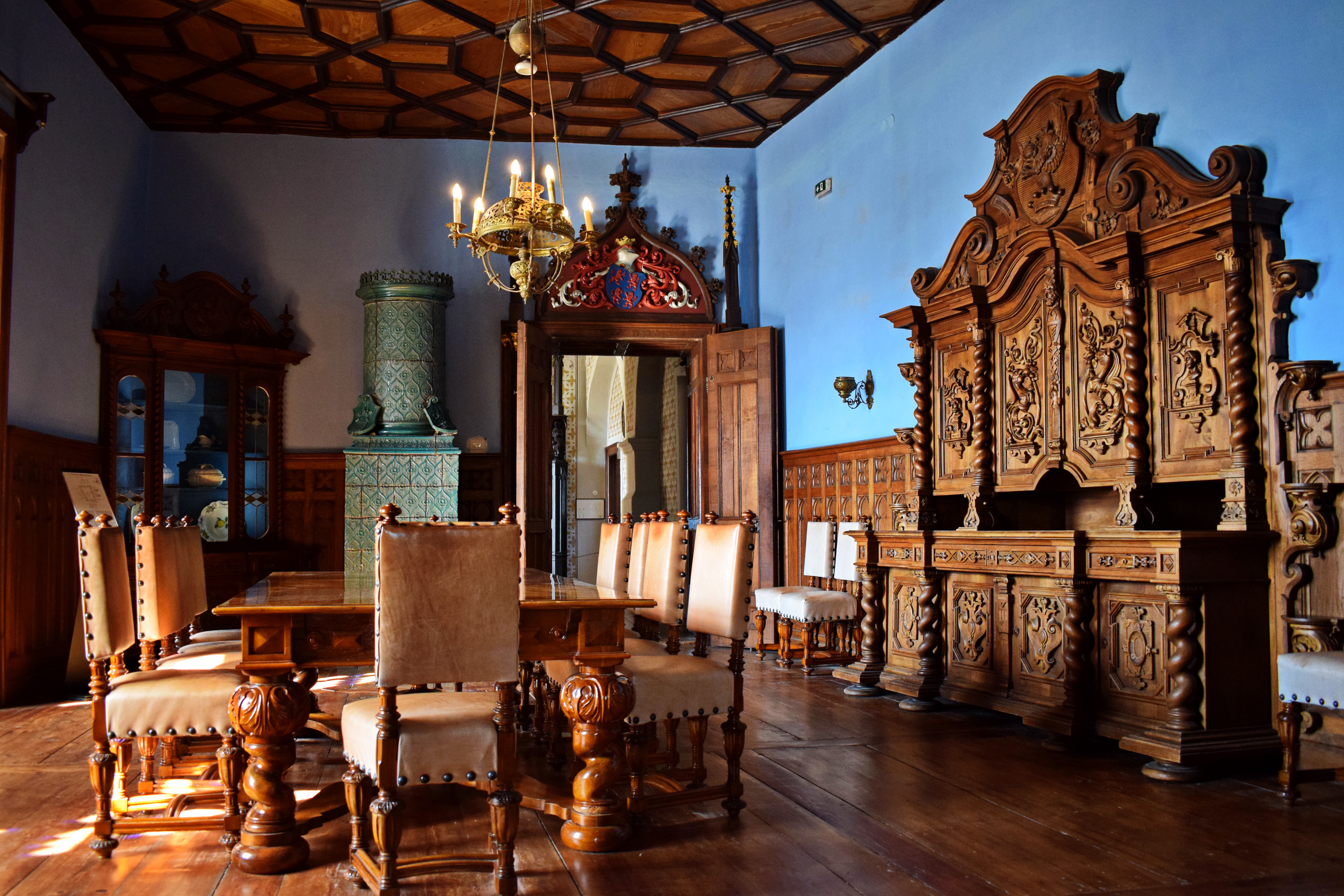

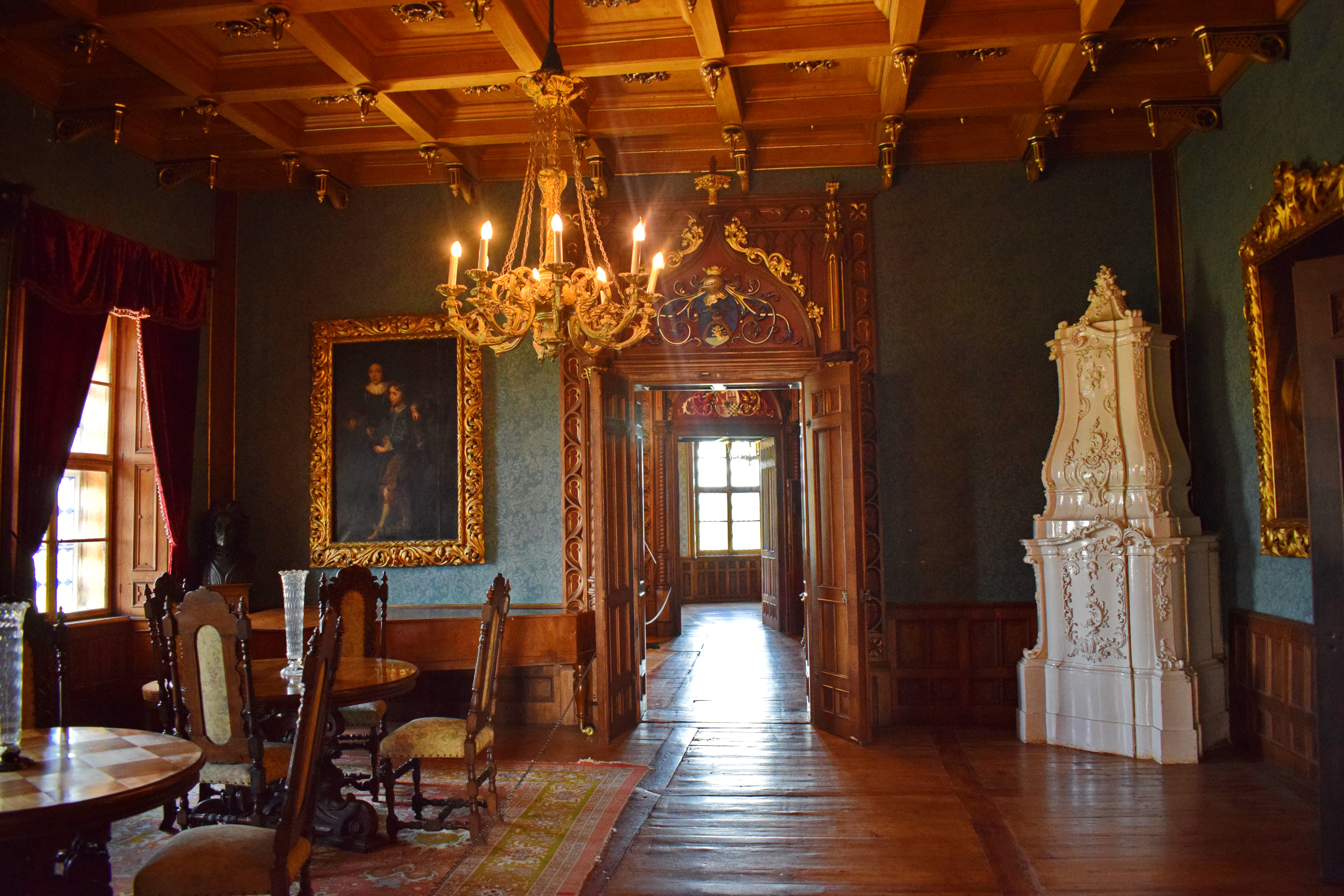

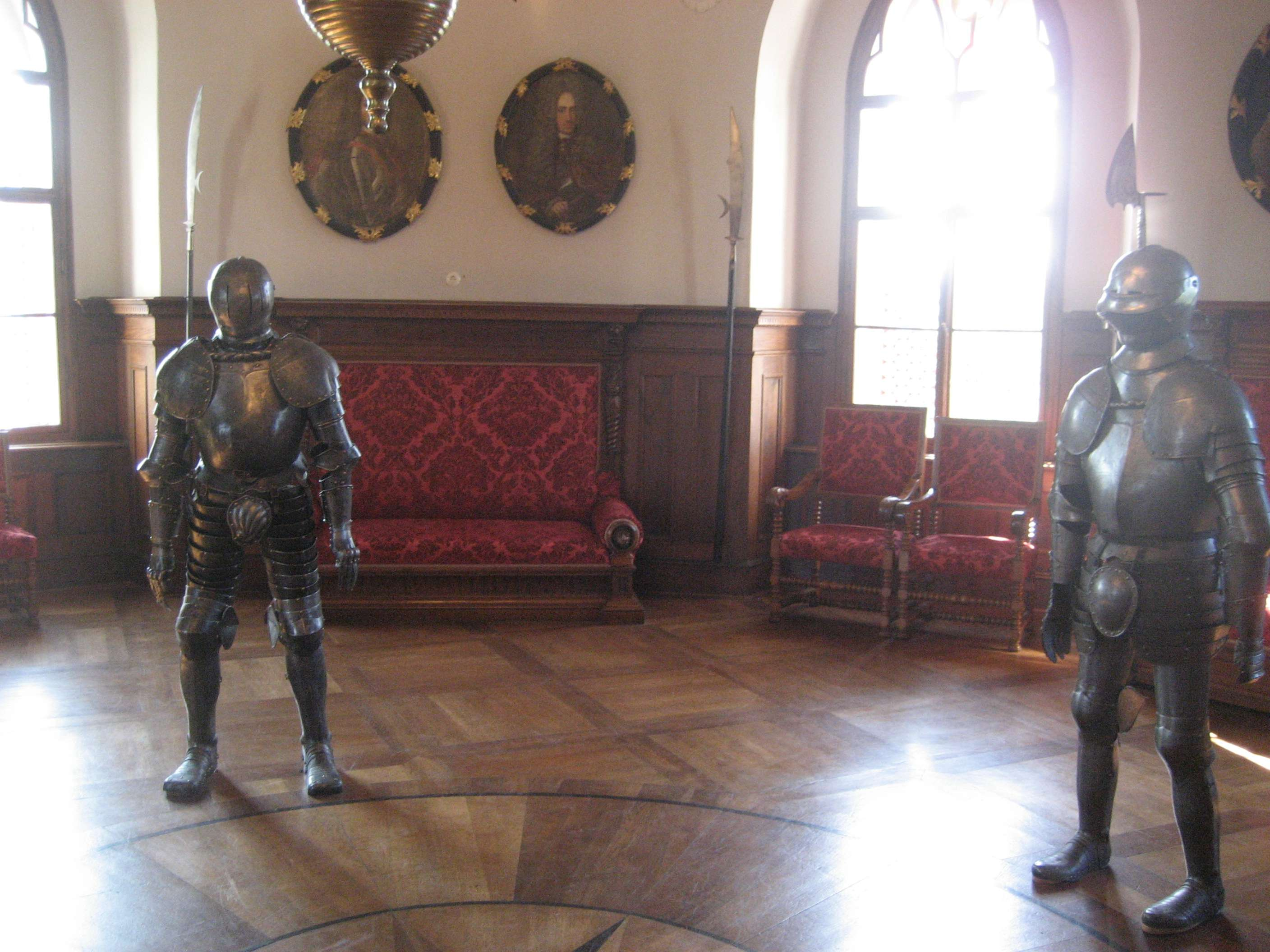

== See also ==
- House of Drašković
- Lake Trakošćan
