= Anton II, Prince Esterházy =

Hungarian noble of the Esterházy family (1936–2025)

Anton Esterházy
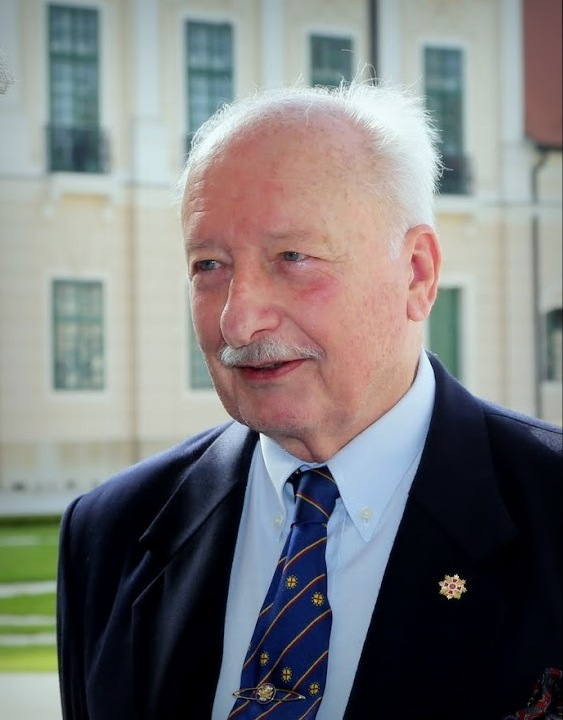

Hereditary Prince of Esterházy
- Reign: 1944–1947
- Successor: Title abolished in 1947
- Born: 27 December 1936
- Died: 22 September 2025 (aged 88)
- Noble family: Esterházy
- Spouse: Svetlana Bardadim
- Children: Paul-Anton Nikolaus Maximilian Prinz Esterházy von Galántha
- Father: Antal Esterházy (prince)
- Mother: Gabriella Apponyi

Anton Esterházy (27 December 1936 – 22 September 2025) was a descendant of Nikolaus, Count Esterházy and was counted as the family's 13th princely member between 1944 and 1947. The family's historical centers included Eisenstadt (Kismarton) and Forchtenstein (Fraknó), later Eszterháza and Fertőd. By the 18th century the Esterházys were regarded among Europe's largest landowners; their private wealth was said to exceed that of the Habsburg monarchs.

== Early life and education ==
In 1944, he lost his father, the adventurer Prince Antal Esterházy, at the age of eight. At the end of the war he was forced to flee Hungary with his mother, Gabriella Apponyi. After years with the Piarists in Hungary, he continued his studies with the Jesuits in Austria; in 1951 he moved to Belgium and in 1955 completed secondary school in French. A native speaker of Hungarian, he also spoke German, English, Dutch and French fluently. Following his school-leaving examination he studied economics and engineering at the Catholic University of Leuven.

== Career ==
As a university student during the 1956 Hungarian Revolution, he assisted Hungarian refugees with the Sovereign Military Order of Malta. He began his career at a Belgian bank and later worked for an American multinational company. His work involved extensive travel; he visited Australia and the United States and lived for several years in Singapore. He first returned to Budapest at the time of the democratic transition to reconnect with family members living in Hungary; in the 1990s he moved back permanently and maintained regular ties with Kismarton as well.

Within the Esterházy family, the title of "hereditary prince" followed the principle of primogeniture. The princely rank was introduced in 1687, and from 1712 it was fixed that the eldest male-line heir would always bear it. When Paul V. Esterházy de Galantha died in 1989 without a son, the title would, under the family rule, have passed to his nephew, Anton Esterházy—had the princely title not been abolished in 1947. While the dignity of family head fell to Antal, control of the property passed, under a right of usufruct, to Prince Pál's widow, Melinda Esterházy, a ballerina of the Hungarian State Opera who, being twenty-five years younger than her husband, had become the prince's consort. Between 1994 and 2004 the Esterházy assets were organized into three private foundations. Operational management was handled by Esterhazy Betriebe GmbH, established in 1991, which became one of Austria's most modern companies under the leadership of Melinda's nephew, István Ottrubay.

Antal Esterházy objected that, beyond the title and representational duties, he exercised no real influence or proprietary rights. Owing to disagreements over asset management and the presentation of the family legacy, he withdrew from the leadership of the Esterházy Private Foundations; in 2004 he returned to the Fertőd palace complex only by invitation, as patron and honorary protector.

After the break, he spent one of the most defining periods of his life in Fertőd, at the Esterházy Palace, where he was offered a suite at the invitation of the Hungarian state. He played a significant role in the life of the Fertőd palace: as organizer and host he supported concerts, historical lectures, and community programs, and his public activity aimed to strengthen the estate's contemporary cultural role.

He received numerous honors, including the Knight's Cross of the Order of Merit of Hungary, awarded for his work in promoting Hungarian culture. As honorary president of the Central European Club Pannonia, he promoted the Fertőd heritage complex at events abroad, including in Paris and Brussels.

For more than three decades Joseph Haydn served as Kapellmeister to the Esterházy court at Eszterháza, where his monumental oeuvre and courtly musical life established a tradition later built upon by the Haydneum – Hungarian Centre for Early Music. As chief patron of the centre, Antal Esterházy supported its programs and regularly attended the Fertőd concerts.

== Personal life and death ==
Prince Esterházy was first married to Ursula König; later he lived with Svetlana Nikolayevna Bardadim. In 2013, he married Svetlana Bardadim.(source).

His only child is Pál-Antal (Paul-Anton Nikolaus Maximilian Prinz Esterházy von Galántha) (*1986), an entrepreneur and founder of the Estoras fragrance brand.

His grandson, Miklós Johann Cedric Maria, was born in 2023.

Prince Esterházy died on 22 September 2025, at the age of 88.

Prince Esterházy's funeral was held in Fertőd on October 5, 2025. On behalf of the Hungarian government and the Prime Minister, State Secretary Tristan Azbej delivered the eulogy, emphasizing that Esterházy “dedicated his life to preserving the spirit of Hungary’s cultural heritage—particularly that of the Fertőd Palace,” and that “his wisdom, humanity, and humility will remain an example to us all.”

== Honours and awards ==
- Knight's Cross of the Order of Merit of Hungary (civil division). Magyar Közlöny, 20 August 2015.
- Honorary Citizen of Fertőd.
- Honorary Citizen of Galánta. Ma7, August 2023.
- Cziráky Margit Prize (Bagatell Foundation lifetime achievement award). Volksgruppen+1, 2010.
- Honorary Citizen of Ozora.

== Sources ==
- Hanna Molden: Griff és rózsa. Esterházy Pál és Ottrubay Melinda története. Elektra Kiadóház, 1999
- Esterházy Pál 1901–1989: Az utolsó herceg a szélsőségek évszázadában. Szerk. Stefan August Lütgenau. Budapest: Balassi. 2008. ISBN 978-963-506-741-1
- Magyar életrajzi lexikon I. (A–K). Főszerkesztő. Kenyeres Ágnes. Budapest: Akadémiai (1967)
- Esterházy V. Pál herceg halálának 25. évfordulója (1901–1989), esterhazy.at
- A herceg – Dr. Esterházy Pál élete The Prince magyar · Historical, biographical, documentary, educational Writer, director. Zsuzsa Katona (2009)
- Egy Esterházy herceg és egy balerina szerelméből alakult ki Ausztria egyik legmodernebb vállalata Euronews (2023)
- Kincs ami van (2013-01-12) - Herceg Esterházy Antal gyermekkora Echo Tv (2013)
