= Anton II =

Anton II may refer to:

- Anton II of Georgia (1762/1763–1827), Catholicos-Patriarch of Georgia
- Anton II, Prince Esterházy (1936–2025), Hungarian prince
