= Cadet branch of the House of Fraknó =

The cadet branch of the House of Fraknó (Forchenstein) was one of the divisions of the noble Esterházy family, with the rank of count (ispán). It descended from Ferenc Esterházy (1641–1683), the younger surviving son of Nikolaus, Count Esterházy. This branch was further divided into three lines by Ferenc's sons.

== Family ==
- Ferenc Esterházy (1641–1683)
  - Antal Esterházy (1676–1722), military commander
    - Bálint József Esterházy, soldier
      - Bálint Miklós Esterházy (1740–1805), military commander and diplomat in France
  - Ferenc Esterházy (1683–1754)
    - Móricz Esterházy (1807–1890) (descendant)
  - József Esterházy

== First branch ==
The eldest of these sons, Count Antal (1676–1722), distinguished himself in the war against Francis II Rákóczi in 1703, but changed sides in 1704 and commanded the left wing of the Kuruczis at the engagements of Nagyszombat (1704) and Vereskö (1705). In 1706 he defeated the imperialist general Guido Starhemberg and penetrated to the walls of Vienna. Still more successful were his operations in the campaign of 1708, when he ravaged Styria, twice invaded Austria, and again threatened Vienna, on which occasion the emperor Joseph I narrowly escaped falling into his hands. In 1709 he was routed by the superior forces of General Sigbert Heister at Palota, but brought off the remainder of his arms very skilfully. In 1710 he joined Rákóczy in Poland and accompanied him to France and Turkey. He died in exile at Rodosto on the shores of the Black Sea.

Antal's son Bálint József, by Anna Maria Nigrelli, entered the French army, and was the founder of the Hallewyll, or French, branch of the family, which became extinct in the male line in 1876 with Count Ladislas.

Count Bálint Miklós (1740–1805), son of Bálint József, made his early life in France. He was an enthusiastic partisan of the duc de Choiseul, on whose dismissal, in 1764, he resigned the command of the French regiment of which he was the colonel. It was Esterházy who conveyed to Marie Antoinette the portrait of Louis XVI on the occasion of their betrothal, and the close relations he maintained with her after her marriage were more than once the occasion of remonstrance on the part of Maria Theresa, who never seemed to forget that he was the grandson of a rebel. At the French court he stood in high favour with the comte d'Artois. He was raised to the rank of maréchal de camp, and made inspector of troops in the French service in 1780. At the outbreak of the French Revolution he was stationed at Valenciennes, where he contrived for a time to keep order, and facilitated the escape of the French emigrés by way of Namur; but, in 1790, he hastened back to Paris to assist the king. At the urgent entreaty of the comte d'Artois in 1791 he left Paris for Coblenz, accompanied Artois to Vienna, and was sent to the court of Saint Petersburg the same year to enlist the sympathies of Catherine the Great for the Bourbons. He received an estate from Catherine, and although the gift was rescinded by Paul I, another was eventually granted him. He died in exile at Grodek in Volhynia on 23 July 1805.

== Second and third branches ==
Two other sons of Count Ferenc, Ferencz and József, founded the houses of Dotis and Cseklész (German: Lanschütz) respectively. Of their descendants, Count Móricz (1807–1890) of Dotis, Austrian ambassador in Rome until 1856, became a member of the ministry formed by Anton von Schmerling in 1861, and in 1865 joined the clerical cabinet of Count Richard Belcredi. His hostility to Prussia helped to force the government of Vienna into the war of 1866. His official career closed in 1866, but he remained one of the leaders of the clerical party.
