= Esterházy =

Hungarian noble family

House of Esterházy
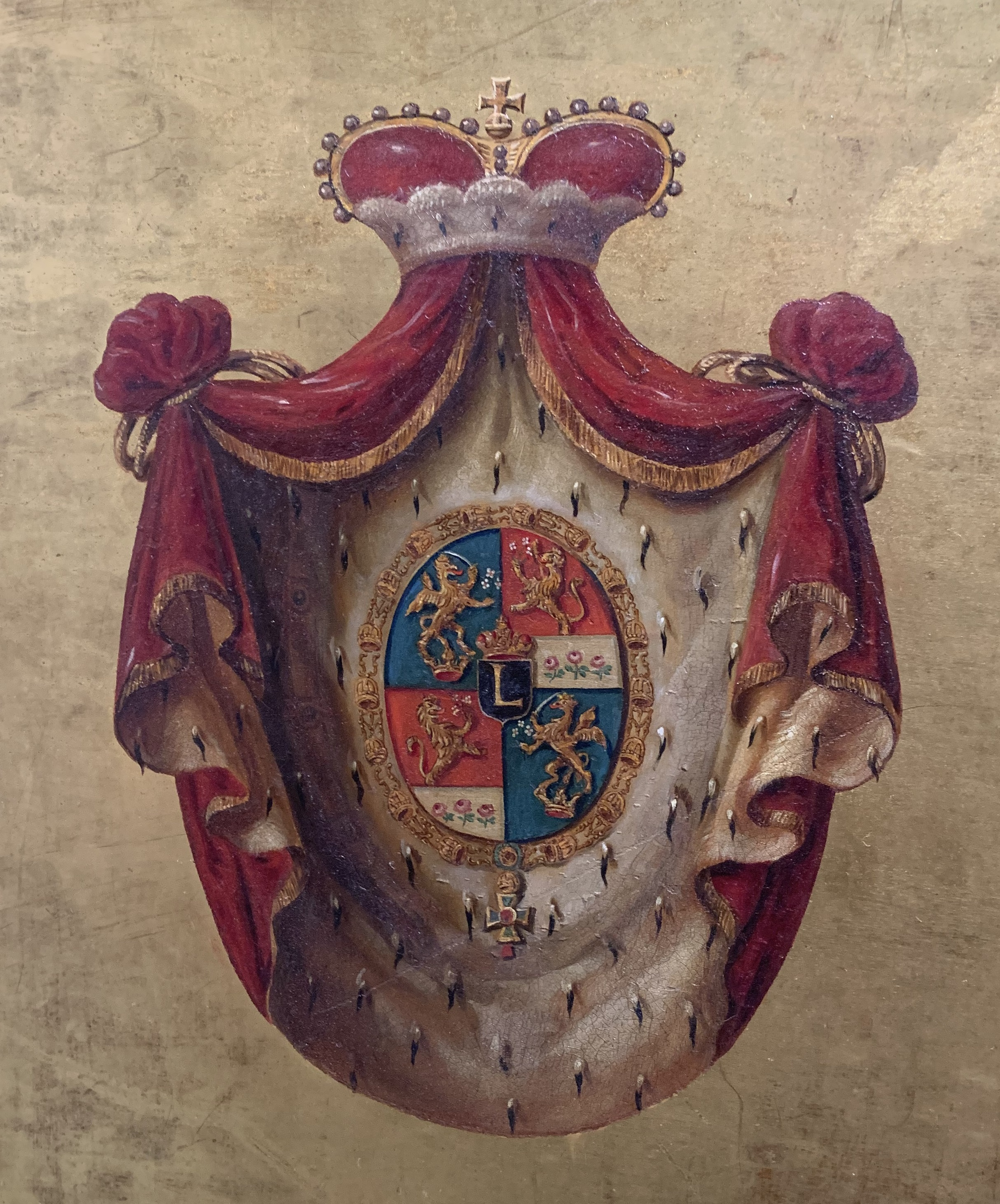
- Country: Kingdom of Hungary; Habsburg monarchy Austria-Hungary
- Founded: 16th century
- Founder: Nikolaus, Count Esterházy
- Current head: Prince Anton Rudolf Esterházy
- Titles: Hungarian Counts; Austro-Hungarian Princes
- Style: Serene Highness

The Eszterházy arms from the 14th to 15th centuries

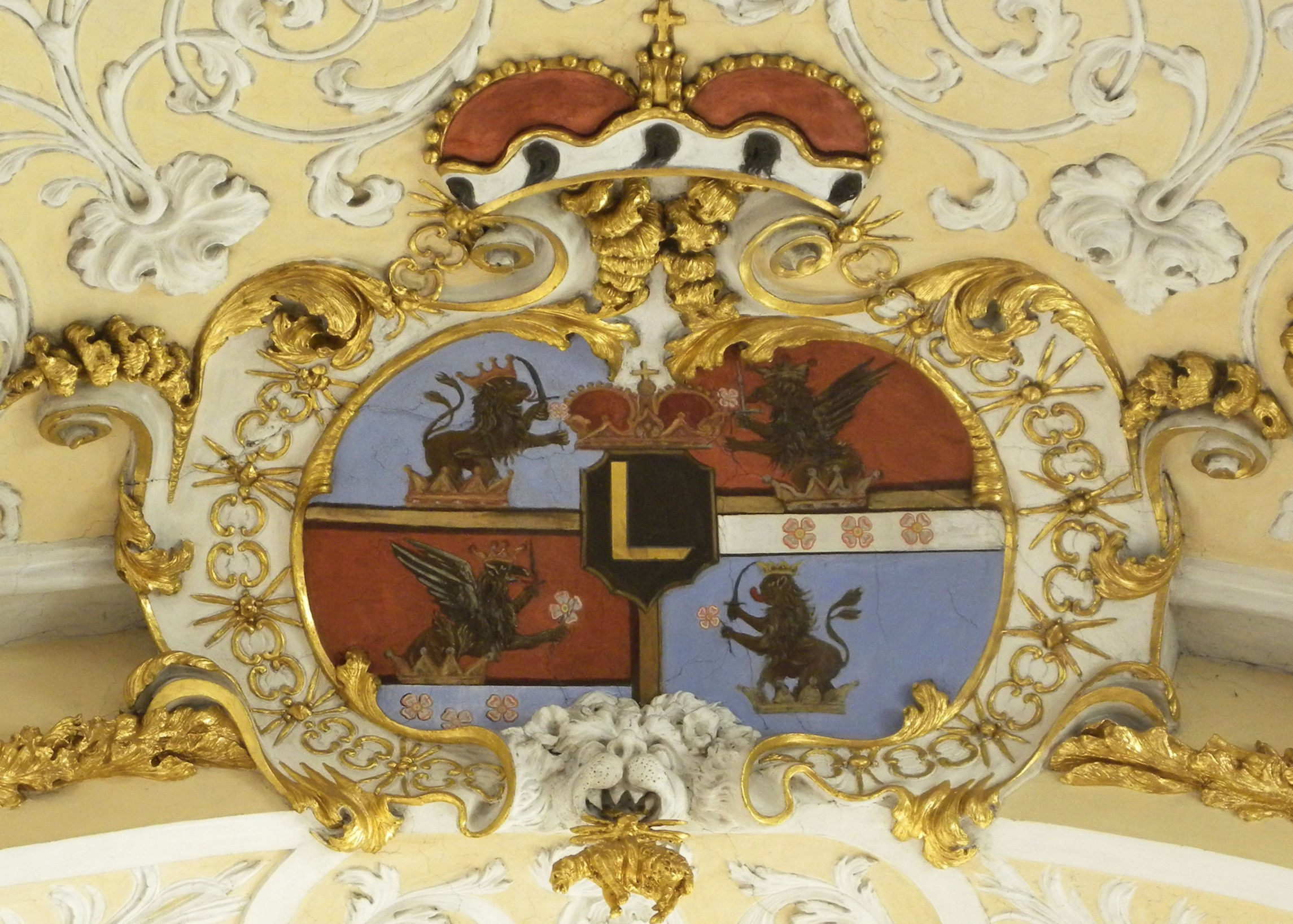
The arms of Paul I, Prince Esterházy (1635–1713)

The House of Esterházy, also spelled Eszterházy (Hungarian pronunciation: [ˈɛstɛrhaːzi]), is a Hungarian noble family with origins in the Middle Ages. From the 17th century, the Esterházys were the greatest landowner magnates of the Kingdom of Hungary, during the time that it was part of the Habsburg monarchy and later Austria-Hungary. During the history of the Habsburg Empire, the Esterházy family were consistently loyal to the Habsburg rulers. The Esterházys received the title of Graf (Count) in 1626, and the Forchtenstein line received the title of Fürst (Prince) from the Holy Roman Emperor in 1712. The Esterházy family’s estate is today Austria’s largest private landholding.

== History ==
The Esterházys arose among the minor nobility of the northern part of the Kingdom of Hungary (today's southwest Slovakia), originally a branch of the Salamon clan (de genere Salamon) by the name Zerházi (de Zerhásház / de Zyrház / de Zyrhas). Their first known ancestor was Mokud (Mocud) from the Salamon clan, who was a military serviceman and landowner in the Csallóköz region of Western Hungary (today Žitný ostrov in southwestern Slovakia), and Pristaldus, a judicial office-holder in the court of Béla III of Hungary.

The name Esterházy was first used by Benedict Zerhas de Zerhashaz (1508–1553), who in 1539 took over the wealth of his wife, Ilona Bessenyei de Galántha. Their son, Ferenc Esterházy (1533–1604) inherited the coat of arms and title of his mother and the full surname of the family became Eszterházy de Galántha, Galanta being a small town east of Bratislava (Hungarian: Pozsony, German: Pressburg), now capital of Slovakia.

The family rose to prominence under Count Nikolaus Esterházy (1583–1645) and his son, Prince Paul Esterházy (1635–1713). In the 17th century, after Nikolaus' acquisitions, the family split into four main family lines:

- the older Forchtenstein (Hungarian: Fraknó) line: founded by Nikolaus Esterházy, main seat: Eisenstadt (Kismarton)
- The three cadet branches:
  - the younger Forchtenstein line
  - the Zólyom line: founded by Paul Esterházy (died 1645)
  - the Csesznek line: founded by Daniel Esterházy (died 1654)

In 1626 the Esterházys were granted the title of Count and in 1712, the older Forchtenstein line received the title of (Ruling) Prince from the Holy Roman Emperor. They had a Sovereign State when they obtained the former Edelstetten Abbey as an Imperial Principality in 1804.

The success of the family arose from the steady accumulation of land, and loyalty both to the Roman Catholic Church and the Habsburg Emperor, the latter factor being the most important. A consistent theme of Hungarian history was an ardent and sometimes violent wish to become free of Austrian rule, a wish that was finally fulfilled at the end of World War I. The Esterházy princes were consistently loyal to the Habsburg monarchy, on several occasions rendered vital services to it in times of crisis. These included the Turkish siege of Vienna in 1683, and the occupation of Vienna by Napoleon in 1809.

The family acquired its property in three principal ways: redistribution of lands taken from Protestants in the Counter-Reformation, redistribution of lands conquered from the Ottoman Empire, and felicitous marriages. Most of these lands were situated in present-day Austria, Slovakia and Hungary. The family ultimately became the largest landowners in the Habsburg Empire, and their income sometimes exceeded that of the Emperor.

The political upheavals of the twentieth century profoundly affected the Esterházy estates. After the dissolution of the Austro-Hungarian Empire in 1918, the family's large landholdings were suddenly divided among several successor states, creating complex legal and administrative challenges for their management.

== Residences ==
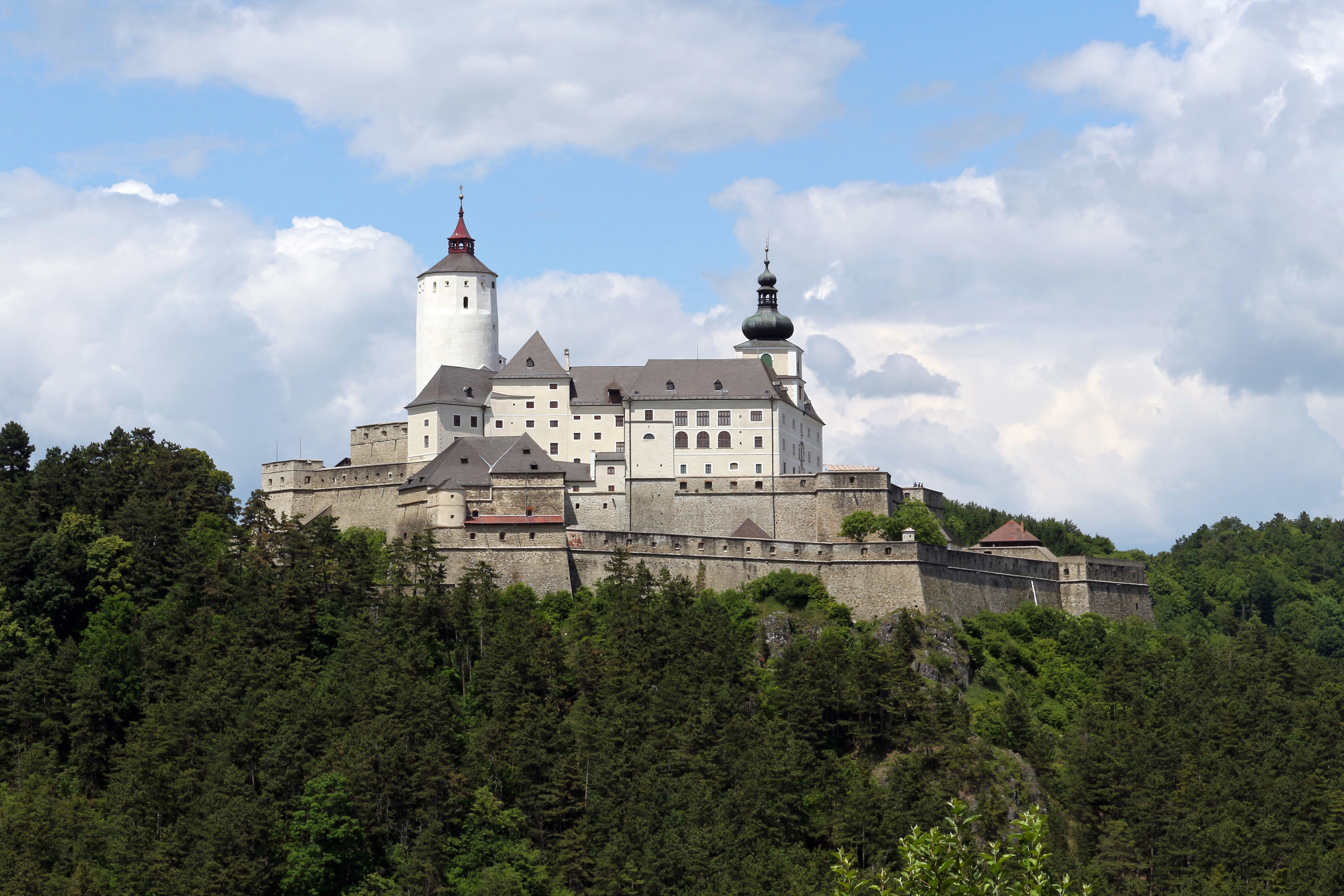
Forchtenstein Castle in Forchtenstein, Austria

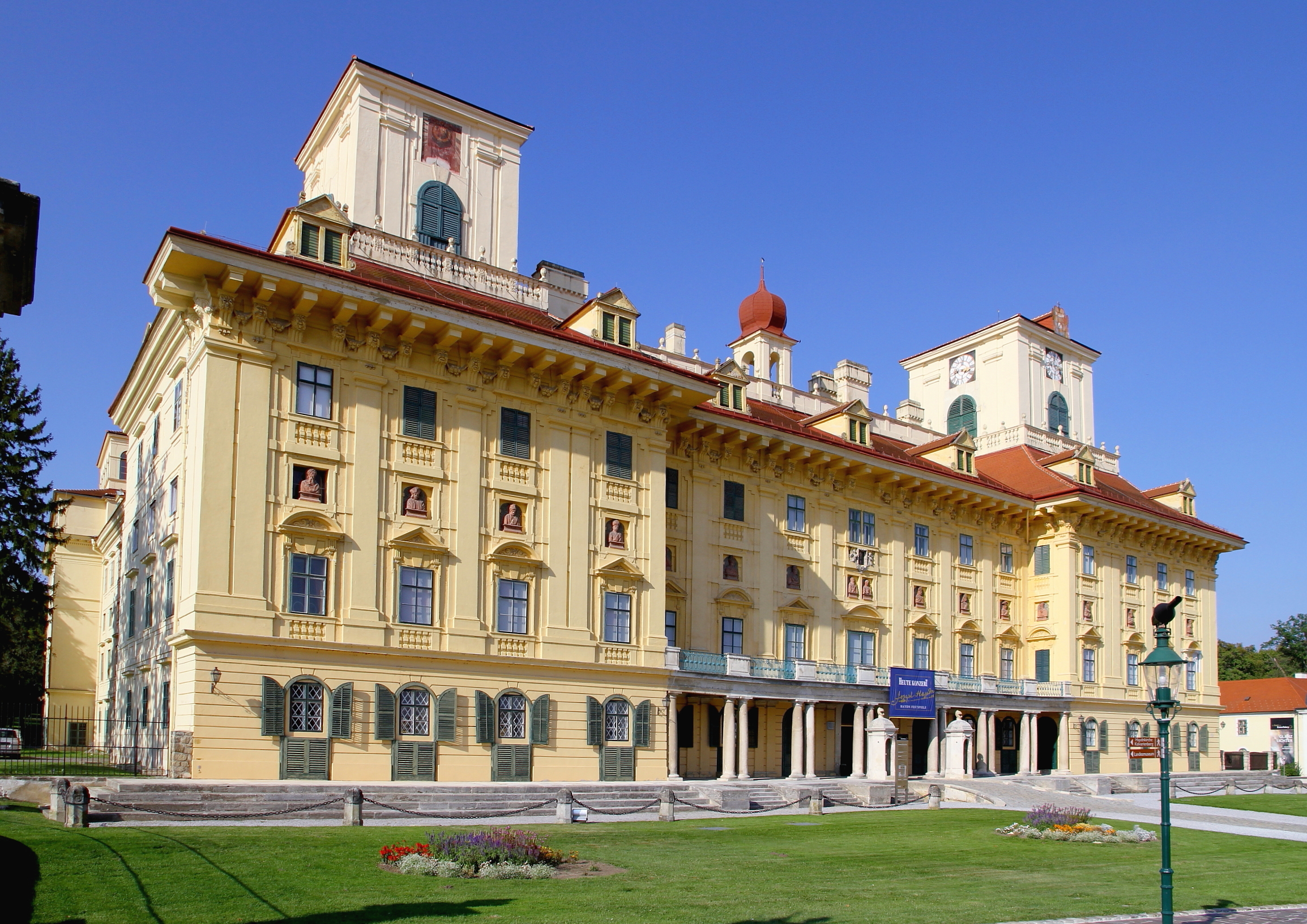
Schloss Esterházy in Eisenstadt, Austria

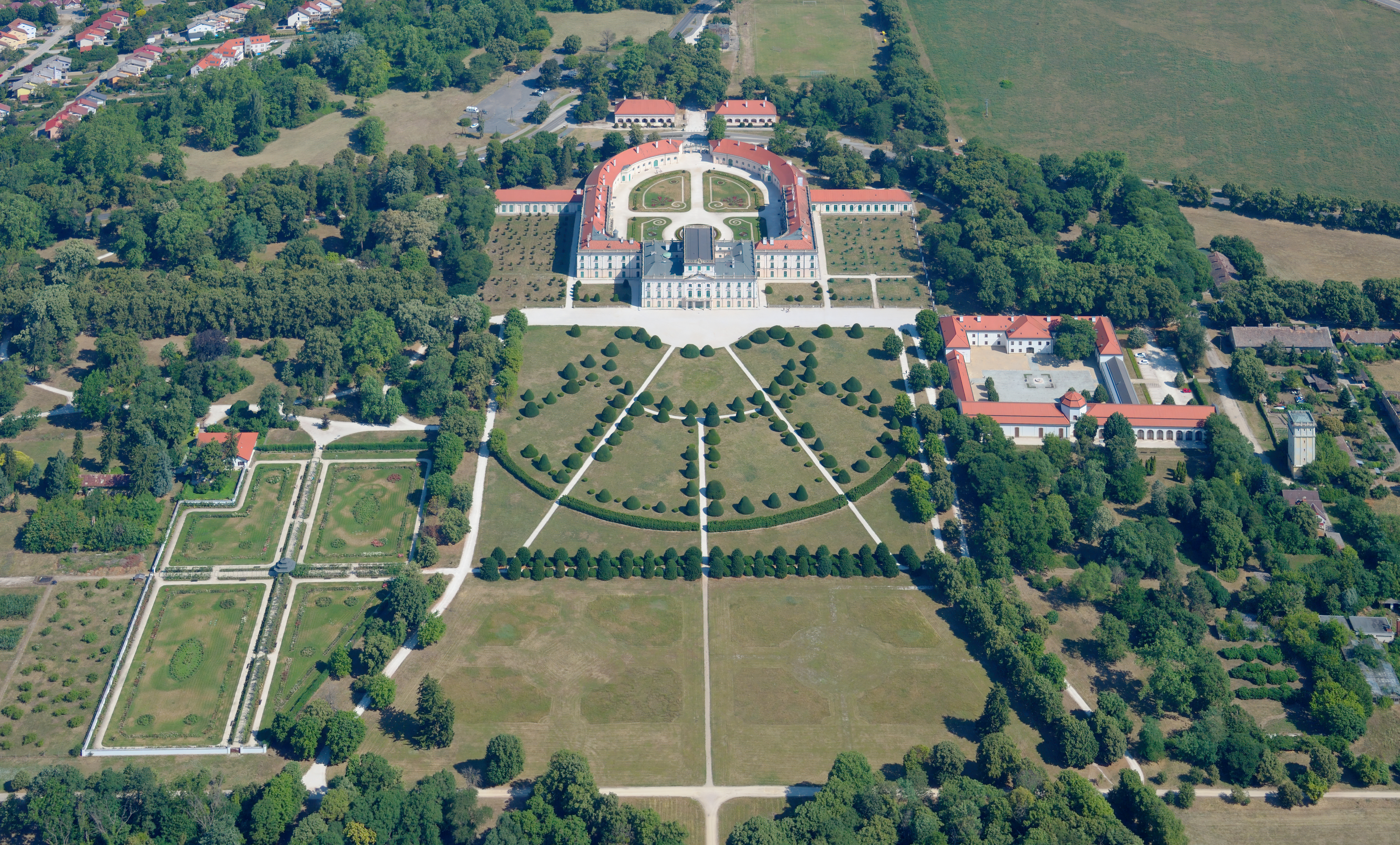
Eszterháza Palace in Fertőd, Hungary

The family derived its name from the settlement Esterháza, Kingdom of Hungary. The settlement no longer exists, and is not to be confused with the later castle of the same name which they inhabited since the Middle Ages. Since 1421 they have been the owners of a property in Galánta.

The most important seat of the Esterházys was Kismarton (today Eisenstadt, Austria), since the heads of the family chose to make a castle in this tiny village their primary residence. A fortified stronghold had been built there in the 14th century; after the Esterházys acquired it they rebuilt it 1663–1672 to what is now the princely Schloss Esterházy. Their practical reason for choosing to create and maintain the princely court at Eisenstadt may have been that while the region was in Hungary, it had been mainly settled by Germans, and was situated rather close to the Habsburgs' Imperial residence, Vienna. (The region remained part of Hungary until 1921, when it was handed over to Austria according to the Treaty of Saint-Germain, 1919, and the Treaty of Trianon, 1920.)

The Esterházys maintained a number of other residences throughout the Kingdom of Hungary, including Transylvania (today part of Romania), and those Esterházy princes who preferred the stylish life of the capital spent most of their time in Vienna. In the 1770s, Prince Nikolaus Esterházy, who disliked Vienna, had a magnificent new palace constructed in Fertőd, Hungary. It was built on the site of a former hunting lodge. Today this is the most admired of the Esterházy homes, often called the "Hungarian Versailles."

== Nomenclature ==
The main line of the Esterházy family were generally bilingual, in Hungarian (as a result of their ethnicity) and German (as they were aristocrats of the Austrian Empire). Esterházys living in parts of the Kingdom of Hungary where other languages were spoken by the population also spoke those languages, especially Slavic languages in Slavic areas. Some family members went by both Hungarian and (rather distinct) German names. Thus, Antal Pál (Hungarian) was the same person as Paul Anton (German), and József Miklós was the same person as Nikolaus Josef. In discussions written in English, the Esterházy princes are occasionally given English versions of their names, as in "Nicholas".

The family name is also rendered variously: Eszterházy (Hungarian spelling), Esterházy (German), and Esterhazy (typographic convenience). The full family name since the 16th century was Eszterházy de Galántha (later also styled von/of Galanta). The Latinised form of the family name, Estoras, in 2009 is used to label fine Esterházy wines.

The Esterházy family is known for its association with the composer Joseph Haydn (1732–1809), who served as their Kapellmeister. Haydn was hired by Prince Paul Anton in 1761, and from 1762 to 1790 served under Paul Anton's successor Nikolaus. During the following reign, that of Prince Anton (1790–1794), the Esterházy family mostly did without the services of musicians, and Haydn, retained on a nominal appointment, spent most of this time in trips to England. Finally, during the reign of Nikolaus II, Haydn worked for the family on a part-time basis. He spent his summers in Eisenstadt and annually composed a mass for the name day of the Prince's wife (and Haydn's friend), Princess Maria Josepha Hermengilde (1768–1845). Haydn continued to perform these duties until his health failed in 1802.

== Lines of the family ==
The first prominent member of the family was Ferenc Zerházy (1563–1594), who was elevated to the title of baron of Galántha (an estate his family had held since 1421) and took the name Esterházy. Family history since this time is described according to three lines of descent, each originating in one of Ferenc's sons: the Fraknó (or Forchtenstein) line, the Csesznek line, and the Zólyom (or Zvolen) line.

=== Fraknó (Forchtenstein) line ===
The Fraknó (Forchtenstein) line became "the most prominent of the three". In the discussion that follows, Hungarian names are given in brackets.

==== Count Nikolaus [Miklós] (1583–1645) ====
Nikolaus was born in Galanta to Ferenc Esterházy and Zsófia Dersffy. After the early death of his parents, he was brought up in the household of his sister Magdolna and her husband, László Kubinyi, at László’s estate in Madocsány, Liptó County. Raised as a Protestant, he later converted to Catholicism. Created Count by the Emperor in 1626, he achieved great wealth in part by marrying (twice) into money.

In 1625, Nikolaus was elected Palatine of Hungary, the King's chief lieutenant within Royal Hungary. Nikolaus laid out what became the long-term family strategy, allying himself with the Catholic religion and the Habsburg emperor. He fought against the Protestant champions and Prince of Transylvania, Gábor Bethlen and György Rákóczi, and sought to free Hungary from Turkish domination.

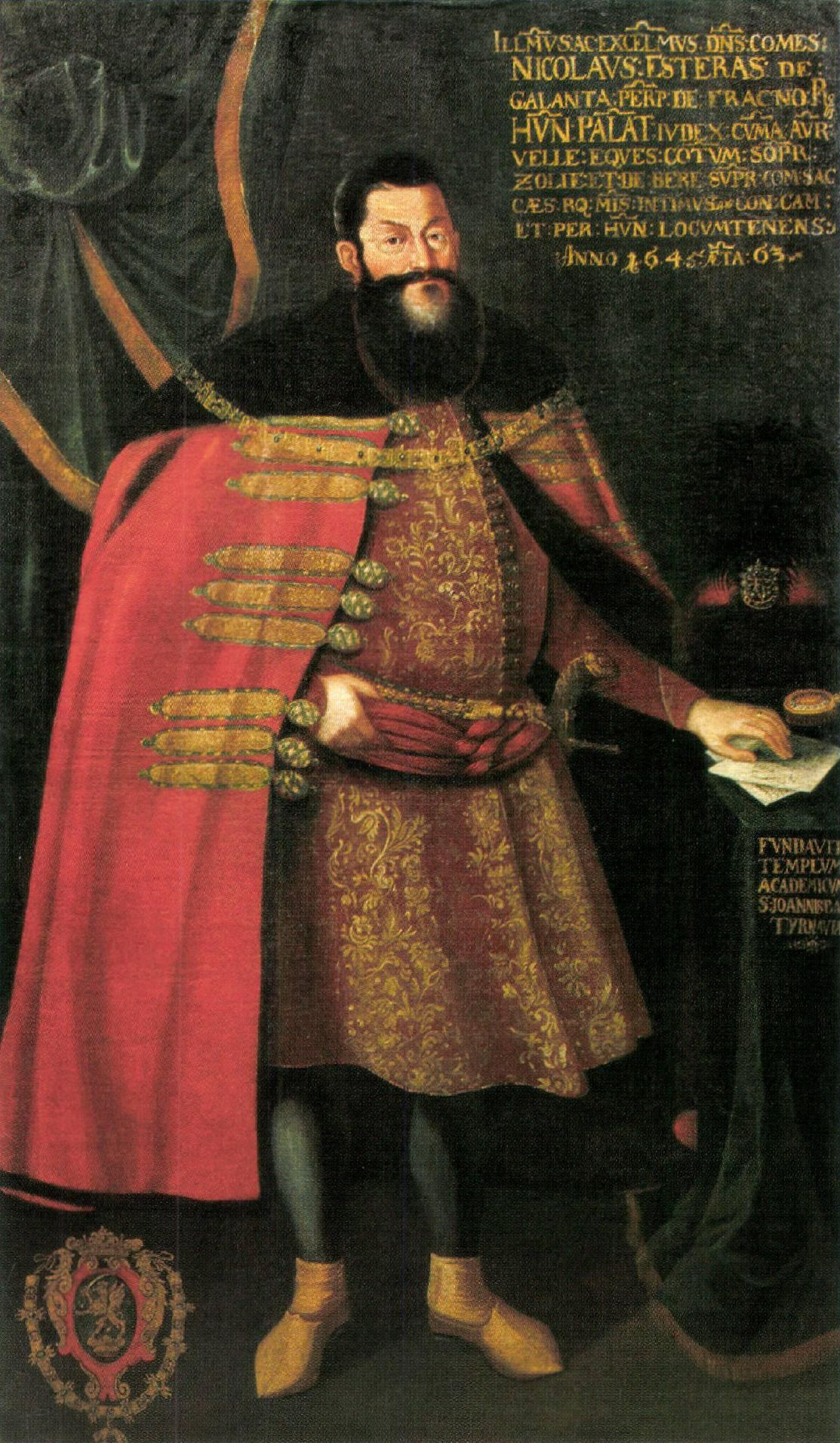
Count Nikolaus Esterházy (1582–1645)

==== Prince Paul [Pál] (1635–1713) ====
Paul was the third son of Nicholas, born in Eisenstadt. Elected Palatine in 1681 and created Prince of the Holy Roman Empire (in Hungary the title of Prince did not exist till the 20th century) in 1687 by the Emperor. Paul was a poet, a harpsichordist, and a composer; a number of his cantatas survive; see Harmonia Caelestis. He also wrote a number of religious works. Under Paul the palace in Eisenstadt was rebuilt. Paul served as commander of troops in southern Hungary, during the struggle against the Turks, starting in 1667, and his troops were among the coalition that raised the siege of Vienna in 1683. He also played an important role in suppressing the autonomy of the existing Hungarian nobility.

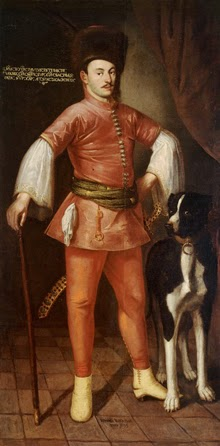
Prince Paul I of Esterházy

The line that descended from Paul, the first Esterházy prince, is given as in the following figure. The sequence of princes that follow him continues below.

Updated Family tree of the Esterhazy family with respective heads of the family marked in yellow

==== Prince Michael [Mihály] (1671–1721) ====
Son of Paul, he was the first to benefit from a 1712 decree of Emperor Charles VI, which made the title of Prince hereditary among the Esterházys. Under him, the family seat at Eisenstadt evolved into a provincial musical center. He died 24 March 1721.

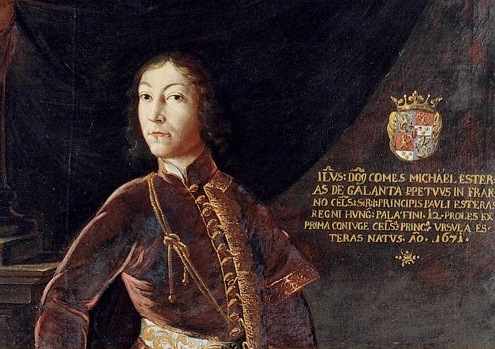
Prince Michael I of Esterházy.

==== Prince Joseph [József Simon Antal] (1688–1721) ====
Half-brother of Michael, he reigned for only 11 weeks, as he died on 7 June 1721. As his son Paul Anton was only ten, authority was assigned to two regents: Count Georg Erdödy, and his widow Maria Octavia von Gilleis (c. 1686 – 1762). The latter was responsible for introducing the German language to the court.

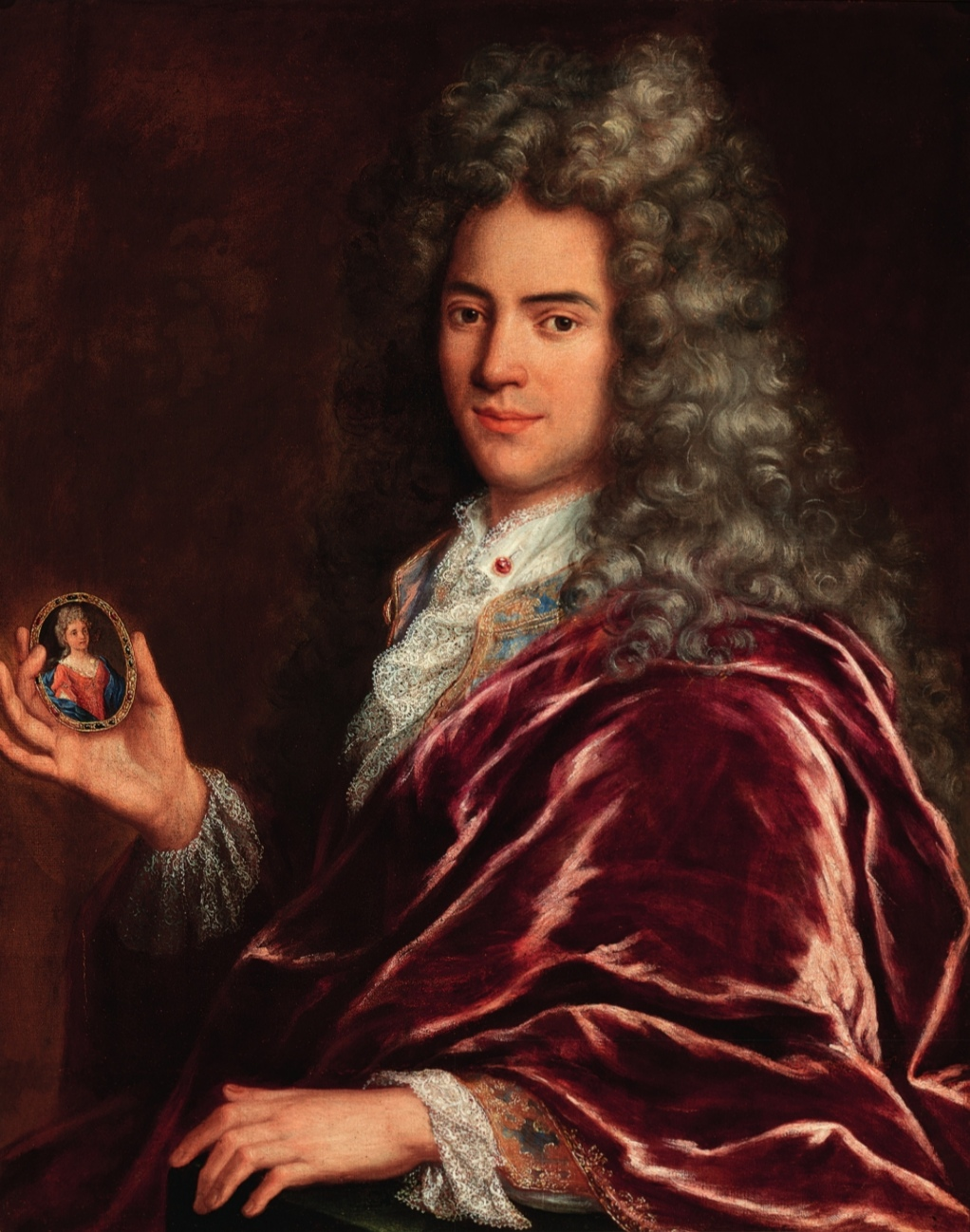
Prince Joseph of Esterházy.

==== Prince Paul Anton [Pál Antal] (1711–1762) ====
The eldest son of Joseph. In his youth he studied in Leyden and also served as a soldier, rising to the rank of Field Marshal. He served as imperial ambassador to Naples from 1750 to 1752, and traveled extensively.

Paul Anton was a musical prince; he played the violin, the flute, and the lute, and compiled a large inventory of musical manuscripts. Paul Anton also played an important role as a patron of music. In 1728, his mother Maria Octavia, "probably at her son's instigation" engaged the composer Gregor Werner to be the family's Kapellmeister (music director), a post in which Werner served for several decades. Much later (1761), Paul Anton engaged Joseph Haydn to be his Vice-Kapellmeister in 1761, taking over most of the aging Werner's duties. At the same time, he upgraded the court orchestra, hiring several virtuosi who served under Haydn; the composer recognized their ability by writing many solo parts in his early symphonies.

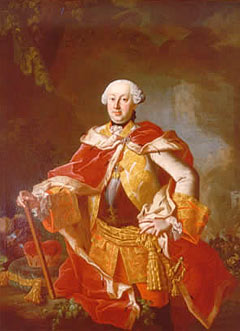
Prince Paul II of Esterházy

==== Prince Nikolaus "the Magnificent" [Miklós József] (1714–1790) ====
The second son of Joseph and brother of Paul II, in his youth a decorated soldier. He was the primary patron of Haydn and builder of Esterháza (see above).

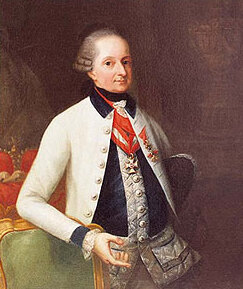
Prince Nikolaus I of Esterházy

==== Prince Anton [Antal] (1738–1794) ====
Son of Nikolaus I, married first, in 1763, Maria Theresia Gräfin Erdödy e Monyorokerek et Monoszlo (1745–1782), and second, in 1785 Maria Anna Gräfin von Hohenfeld (1768–1848). He was elevated to the status of Prince (Fürst) in 1783. He received the Order of St. Stephen in 1777. He was Captain of the Hungarian Noble Life Guard from September 1791 until his death in 1794, and commanded an autonomous corps on the Upper Rhine at the beginning of the War of the First Coalition. His Corps participated in various actions between July and October, 1792, after which he received the Commanders Cross of the Order of St. Stephen. His corps was later absorbed into other military formations. He was Colonel and Proprietor (Inhaber) of the 31st Infantry Regiment, from November 1777 to October 1780, and then Proprietor and Colonel of the 34th Infantry Regiment, from September 1780 until his death. He was initiated to the Order of the Golden Fleece in 1790, and also became an imperial Chamberlain. He disbanded the Esterházy musical establishment for the duration of his reign.

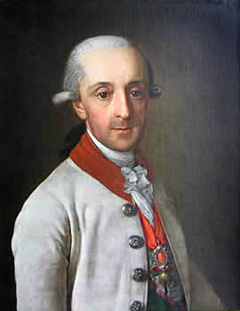
Prince Anton [Antal] (1738–1794)

==== Prince Nikolaus II [Miklós Ferdinánd] (1765–1833) ====
Born in Vienna, on 12 December 1765, he was the son of Anton and his first wife Maria Theresia. He became reigning Prince on the death of his father in 1794.

Like several of his predecessors Nikolaus II pursued a military career. He is remembered for his amassing a large art collection, for his musical patronage of Haydn and Beethoven, for his sexual debauchery, and for his high expenditures. Ultimately these led to the family being placed under a sequestration order, roughly the equivalent of bankruptcy.

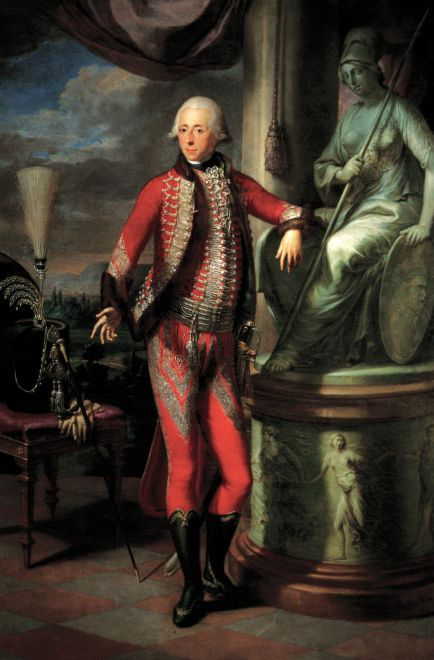
Nikolaus II as portrayed by Martin Knoller in 1793. Oil on canvas. Esterházy Privatstiftung, Burgenland.

==== Prince Paul Anton III [Pál Antal] (1786–1866) ====
Served Austria in a series of diplomatic posts, and in 1848 was briefly Foreign Minister.

The family encountered financial trouble during his reign, and (according to the Encyclopædia Britannica Eleventh Edition, ), "the last years of his life were spent in comparative poverty and isolation, as even the Esterházy-Forchtenstein estates were unequal to the burden of supporting his fabulous extravagance and had to be placed in the hands of curators."

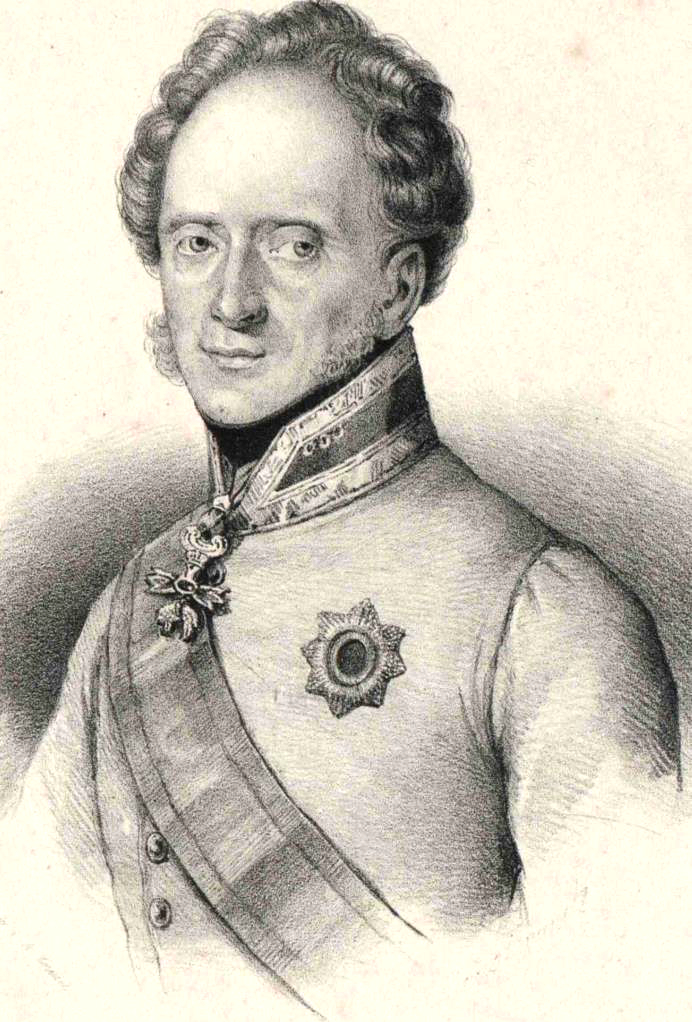
Prince Paul Anton III [Pál Antal] (1786–1866)

==== Prince Nikolaus III [Miklós Pál] (1817–1894) ====
Owing to financial trouble, Nikolaus III sold the family art collection "on generous terms" to the Austro-Hungarian state in 1870. The collection is, as a result, on public view today in the Museum of Fine Arts in Budapest.

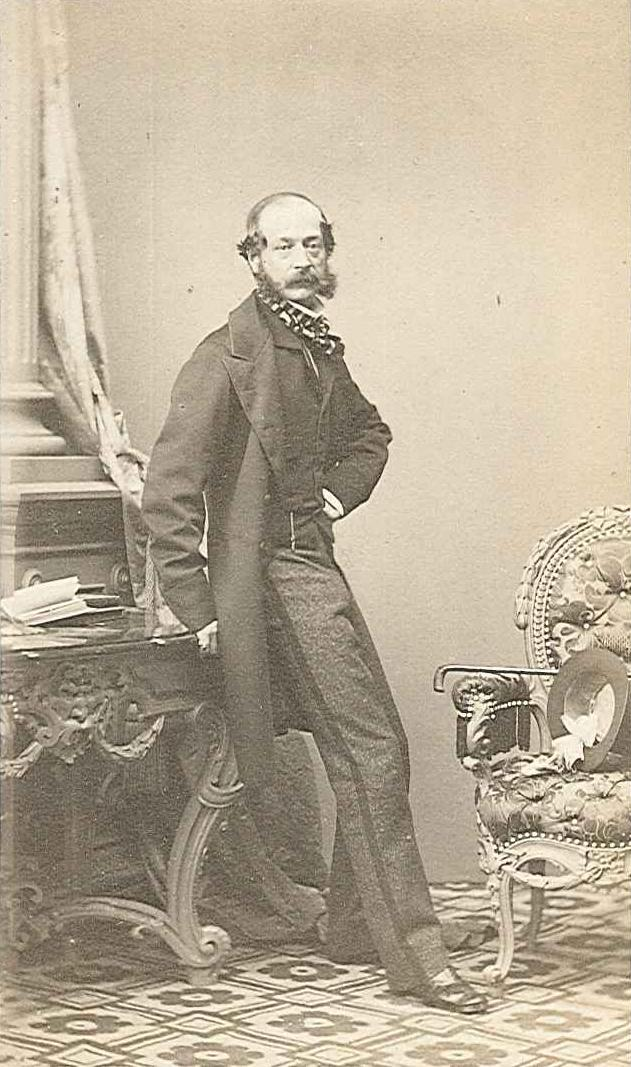
Nicholas III, Prince Esterhazy

==== Prince [Pál Antal Miklós] (1843–1898) ====
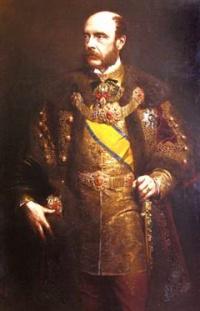
Prince Paul IV of Esterházy

==== Prince Nikolaus IV [Miklós Pál] (1869–1920) ====
The reign of Nikolaus IV was a time of revival for the Esterházy family fortunes. The family estates were made into flourishing businesses, including a "traditional welfare net, providing security for employees." With the resulting improvement in the family finances, the family properties were finally released from decades of sequestration. In addition, the family palaces—including the long-abandoned Esterháza—were restored and provided with modern plumbing and electricity. In these efforts Nikolaus was greatly assisted by his wife, Princess Margit (1874–1910), née Countess Cziráky. He owned 558,403 acres.

Prince Nikolaus IV, his wife Margit, their son Anton († 1944) and other family members are buried in the Esterházy family cemetery in Fertőd, which is located in a small park around two kilometers northeast of the Eszterháza Palace (position: 47°38′08.1″N 16°53′04.8″E).

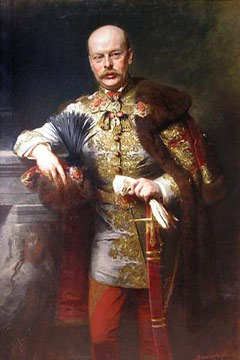
Prince Nikolaus IV of Esterházy

==== Prince Paul V [Pál Maria Alois Antal Miklós Victor] (1901–1989) ====
The lifetime of this prince witnessed momentous, often catastrophic changes for the Esterházy family. At the end of the First World War, the Austro-Hungarian Empire was split up, and the family's land holdings thus came to be located in several different countries.

In 1938, the legal instrument of fideicommiss, which had allowed families to hold property in foundations owned by the whole family, but governed by the head of the family alone, was abolished in Austria (aristocratic families had used this instrument to finance the representative household of the head of the family as well as to maintain palaces and castles, and to pay allowances to family members without personal wealth.) After the dissolution of the Esterházy trust, prince Paul became the sole owner of the wealth accumulated therein so far.

The Second World War proved disastrous: the family was scattered during the war years, and at the end of the war the new Hungarian government carried out a comprehensive land reform, "confiscating the land of gentry with estates of more than 50 hectares". Only the land in Austria remained in prince Paul's possession. Further, in the years after 1945 Hungary came under the rule of the Hungarian People's Republic, an authoritarian Communist regime sponsored by the Soviet Union. Prince Paul endured a show trial and was sentenced to solitary confinement for 15 years. Freed in the Hungarian Revolution of 1956, he moved to Zurich with his wife, Melinda Ottrubay, whom he had married in Budapest in 1945, and lived in Zurich, from there managing his Austrian domains, until his death.

Paul's wealth was inherited by his wife Melinda. Since she had no children, she created several foundations to preserve the cultural and historic heritage of the family, with the historic family seat Schloss Esterházy in Eisenstadt as the centre of all activities. Her nephew Stefan Ottrubay acts as general manager.

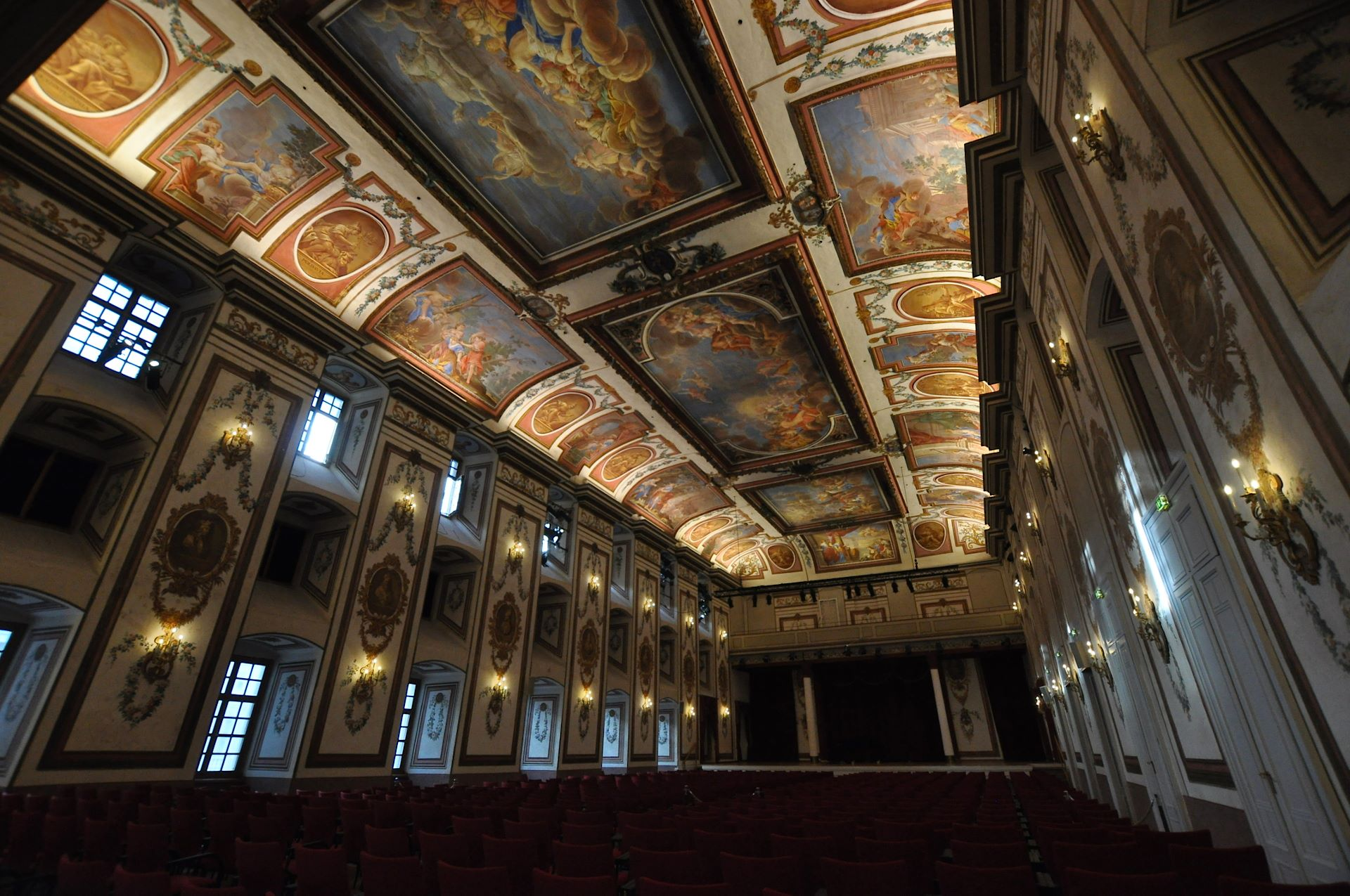
Kismarton, Schloss Esterházy

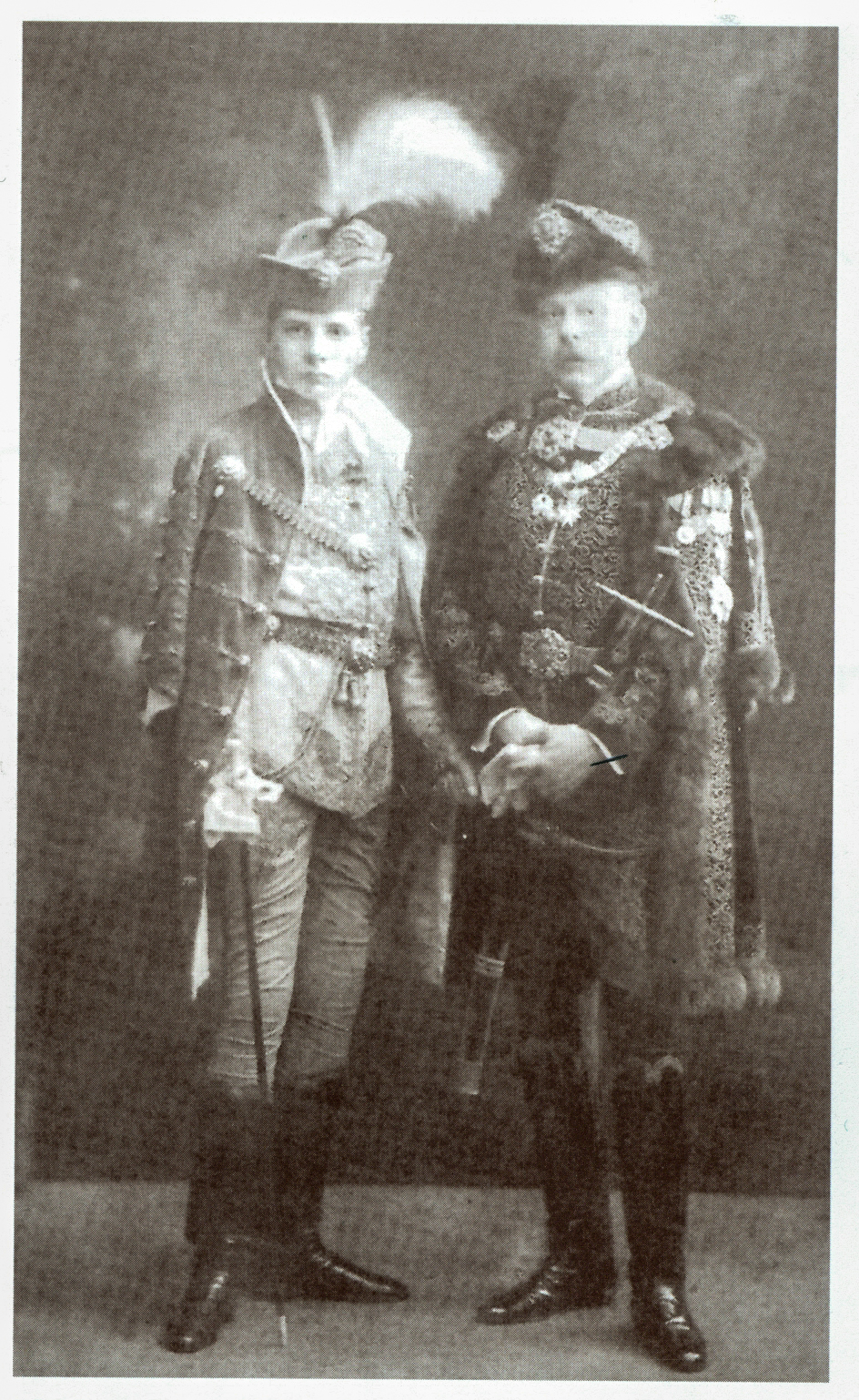
Prince Paul V of Esterházy with his father, Prince Nikolaus IV

==== Prince Anton Rudolf Marie Georg Christoph Hubertus Johannes Karl Aglaë (1936–2025) ====
Prince Paul-Anton Nikolaus Maximilian, born in Munich in 1936. The title of Prince has no legal standing in Hungary today, as noble titles were abolished in 1947 (for details see Hungarian nobility). In Austria, aristocratic titles were abolished in 1919.

		Prince Esterházy			Wife
1.	Paul I Esterházy (1635-1713)	1687	March 26, 1713	Ispán of Moson County, Kingdom of Hungary, Palatine of Hungary	Countess Orsolya Esterházy of Galántha Countess Éva Thököly of Késmárk
2.	Michael I Esterházy (1671-1721)	March 26, 1713	March 24, 1721	The chief lord of the county of Sopron Royal Court Master Imperial and Royal Chamberlain Imperial and Royal Councillor	Anna Margherita di Tizzoni Blandrata
3.	Joseph I Esterházy (1688-1721)	March 24, 1721	June 6, 1721	The chief steward of the county of Sopron is the chief steward of the county of Somogy	Maria Octavia von Gilleis
4.	Paul II Anton Esterházy (1711-1762)	June 6, 1721	March 18, 1762	The chief lord of the county of Sopron	Donna Maria Anna Louisa Lunatti-Visconti
5.	Nikolaus I, Prince Esterházy (1714-1790)	March 18, 1762	September 28, 1790	The chief lord of the county of Sopron	Marie Elisabeth Ungnad von Weißenwolff
6.	Anton I Esterházy (1738-1794)	September 28, 1790	January 22, 1794	The chief lord of the county of Sopron	Countess Maria Theresia Erdödy de Monyorokerek et Monoszlo
7.	Nikolaus II Esterházy	January 22, 1794	November 25, 1833	Lord of the county of Sopron was the captain of the Hungarian royal noble bodyguard	Princess Maria Josepha Hermengilde von Liechtenstein
8.	Paul III Anton Esterházy (1786-1866)	November 25, 1833	May 21, 1866	Minister of Foreign Affairs (Hungary)	Princess Maria Theresia of Thurn and Taxis
9.	Nikolaus III Esterházy (1817-1894)	May 21, 1866	January 28, 1894	The chief lord of the county of Sopron	Lady Sarah Child-Villiers
10.	Paul IV Esterházy (1843-1898)	January 28, 1894	August 22, 1898	The chief lord of the county of Sopron	Maria von und zu Trauttmansdorff-Weinsberg
11.	Nikolaus IV Esterházy (1869-1920)	August 22, 1898	April 6, 1920	The chief lord of the county of Sopron	Countess Margit Cziráky
12.	Paul V Esterházy (1901-1989)	April 6, 1920	May 25, 1989		Ottrubay Melinda
13.	Anton II Esterházy (1936–2025)	May 25, 1989	22 September 2025		Ursula Koenig

=== Other members of the Esterházy family ===
Listed chronologically.

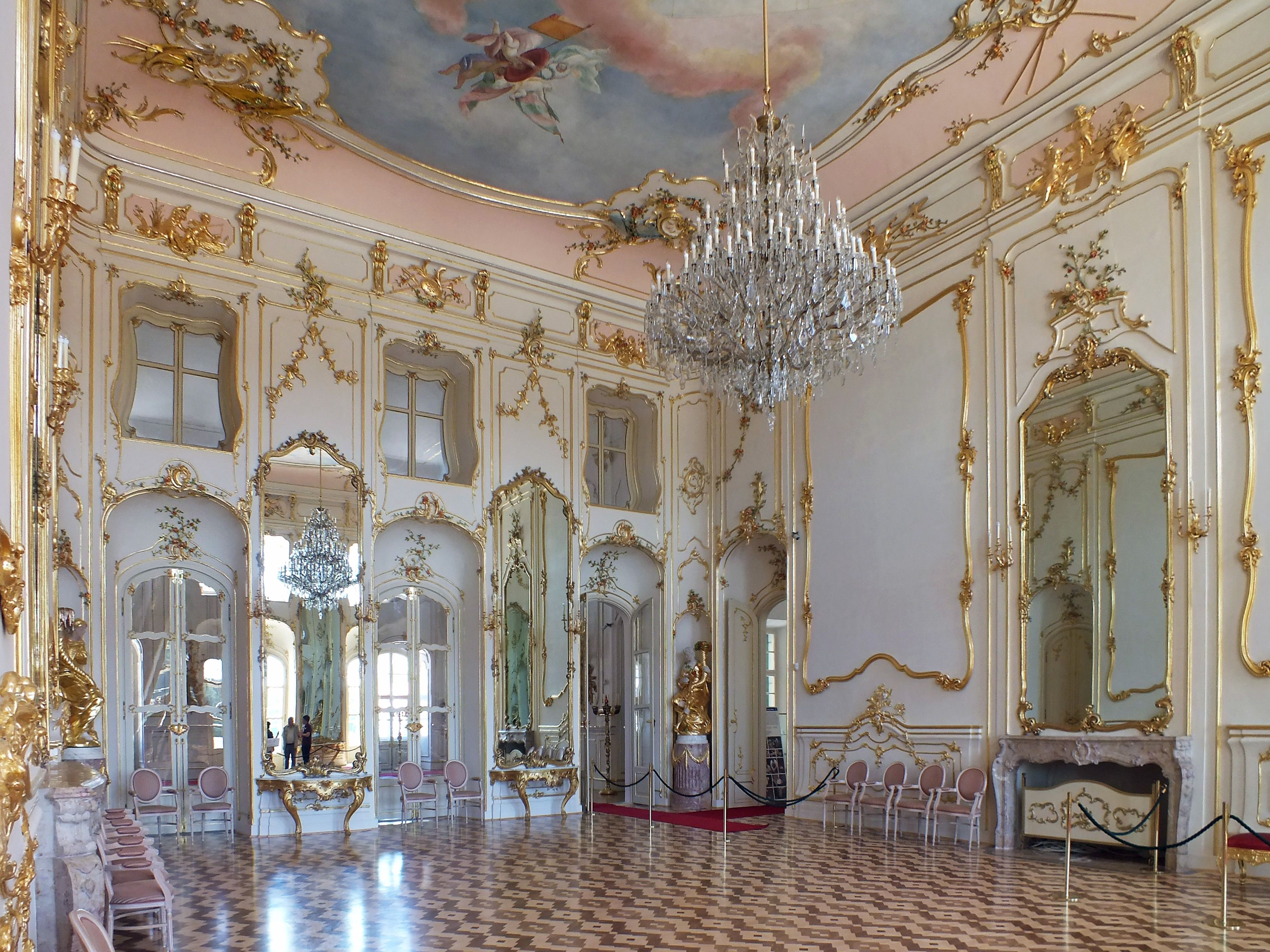
Eszterháza Palace, Great hall

- Count Carolus [Károly] (1725–1799). Son of Countess Szidónia Pálffy and Count Ferenc, Bishop of Eger. Founder of the Eszterházy Károly Főiskola (College) in Eger (1774).
- Joseph Eszterházy was nephew to Palatine Paul. He was Ban of Croatia between 1733 and 1741. Francis Eszterházy also held that title between 1783 and 1785, but he was opposed by Francis Széchenyi.
- Count Mihály Esterházy (1783–1874) was a member of the National Defence Committee (Országos Honvédelmi Bizottmány, or OHB) during the 1848 Revolution, as well as a patron of the arts. He was a leading figure of the Hungarian Reform Era.
- Count Miguel Esterházy (1825–1923) was a honvéd captain during the Hungarian Revolution of 1848.
- Count Kálmán Esterházy (1830–1915), was a politician who served in the Hungarian Diet, ad well as Lord Lieutenant of Kolozsvár.
- Ferdinand Walsin Esterhazy (1847–1923), a minor member of the family (grandson of an illegitimate child of an Eszterházy countess), was notorious for his role in the Dreyfus affair.
- Count Paul Oscar Esterházy was an immigration agent, who, in 1886, settled south of the present town of Esterhazy, in Saskatchewan, Canada with 35 Hungarian families from the vicinity of Kaposvár. His claim to the Esterházy name was never recognized by the Esterházy family, although he claimed he had "incontrovertible proof of the legality of my claim and of birthright".
- Count János Esterházy (1901–1957) was a politician in Czechoslovakia and later Slovak Republic during the WWII, renowned for being the only member of the Slovak parliament to vote against the expulsion of the Jews in 1942.https://www.iwp.edu/articles/2020/09/29/a-saintly-underdog-count-janos-esterhazy/ After the war ended, he was arrested and imprisoned in the Soviet Union, later charged with treason and collaboration with the Nazis, sentenced, and died in prison in Czechoslovakia; in Russia he was posthumously rehabilitated in 1993.
- The renowned Hungarian writer Péter Esterházy (1950–2016) was the grandson of Count Móric Esterházy (1881–1960), prime minister of Hungary and one of the five biggest landowners of Hungary. After the regime change in 1989, Péter Esterházy refused to accept the return of any land or valuables nationalised by the communists.
- Katalina Esterházy is the maiden name of the wife of the late Timothy Landon, a Brigadier General and Knight who was instrumental in the modernization of Oman.
- Márton Esterházy (born 1956) is the younger brother of Péter Esterházy. He was a soccer player, playing for the Hungarian national team between 1980 and 1988 and took part in the world championship of 1986, in Mexico. He obtained 29 caps and scored 11 goals. At the club level, Márton played for Budapest Honvéd and also AEK Athens.
- Christine Esterházy (born 1959), German opera singer and wife of Count Endre Esterházy von Galántha.
- Paul-Anton Nikolaus Maximilian Prinz Esterházy von Galántha (born 1986) is the current speaker of the family

== Esterházy properties ==
While the family's Hungarian residences and estates were lost in 1945, the Austrian and German properties still remain in the family. The widow of Prince Paul, Melinda Esterházy, created several foundations to preserve the cultural and historic heritage of the family.

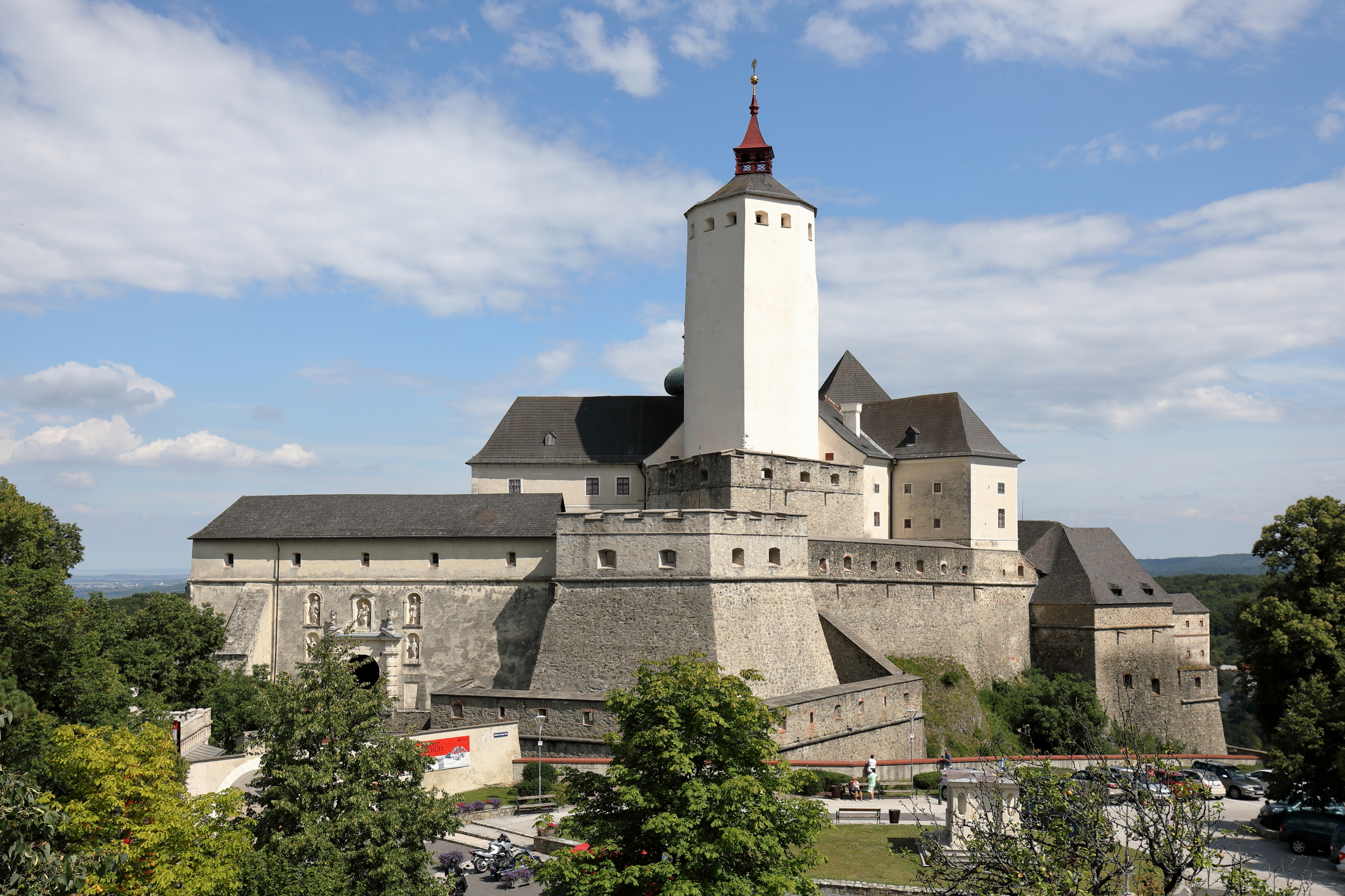
Forchtenstein Castle, Austria (owned by the family: 1622–present)

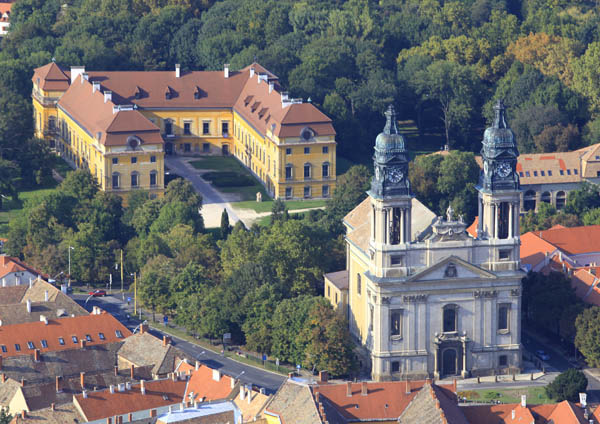
Pápa Castle, Hungary (1626–1945)

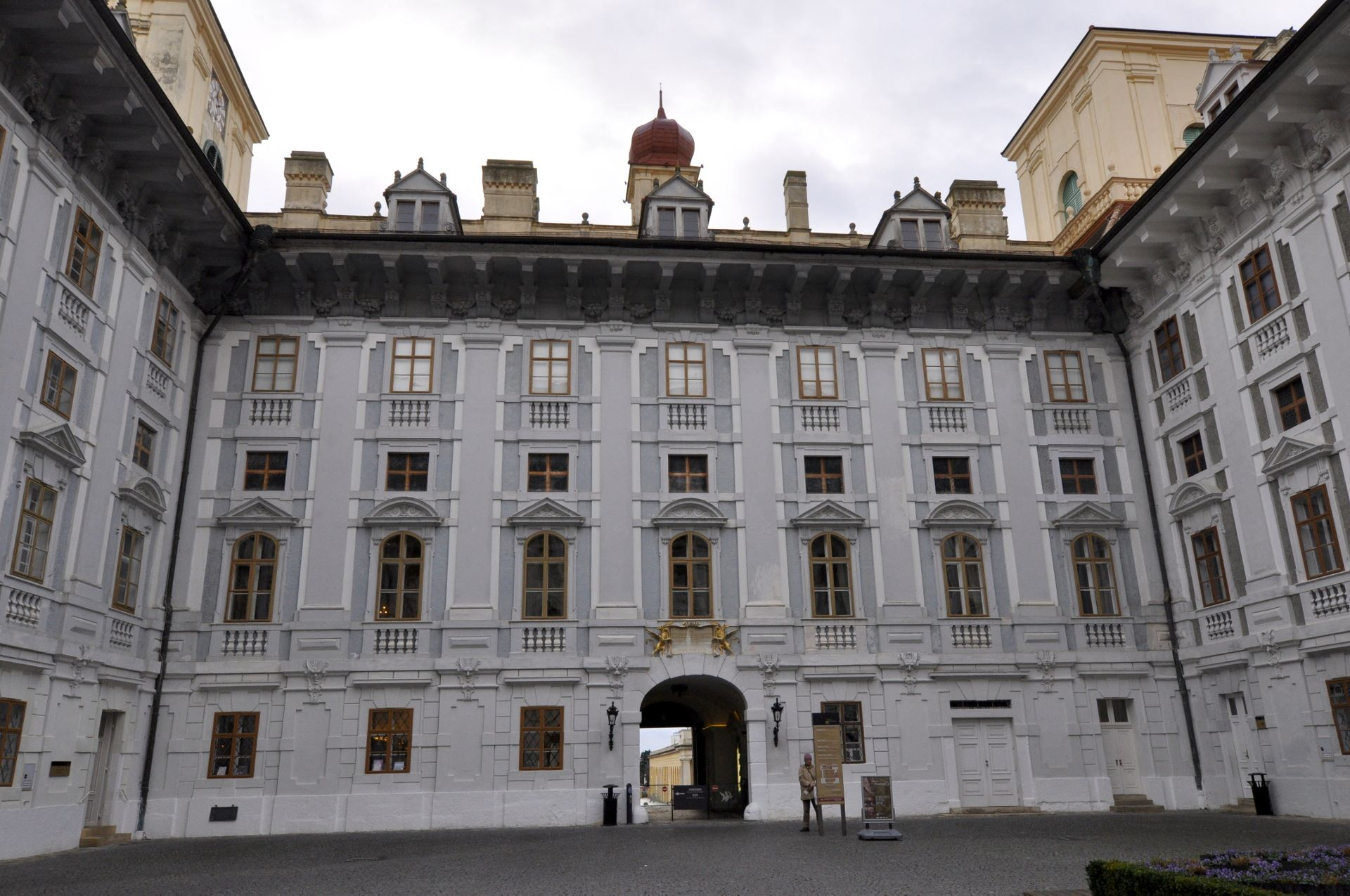
Schloss Esterházy, Austria (1649–present)

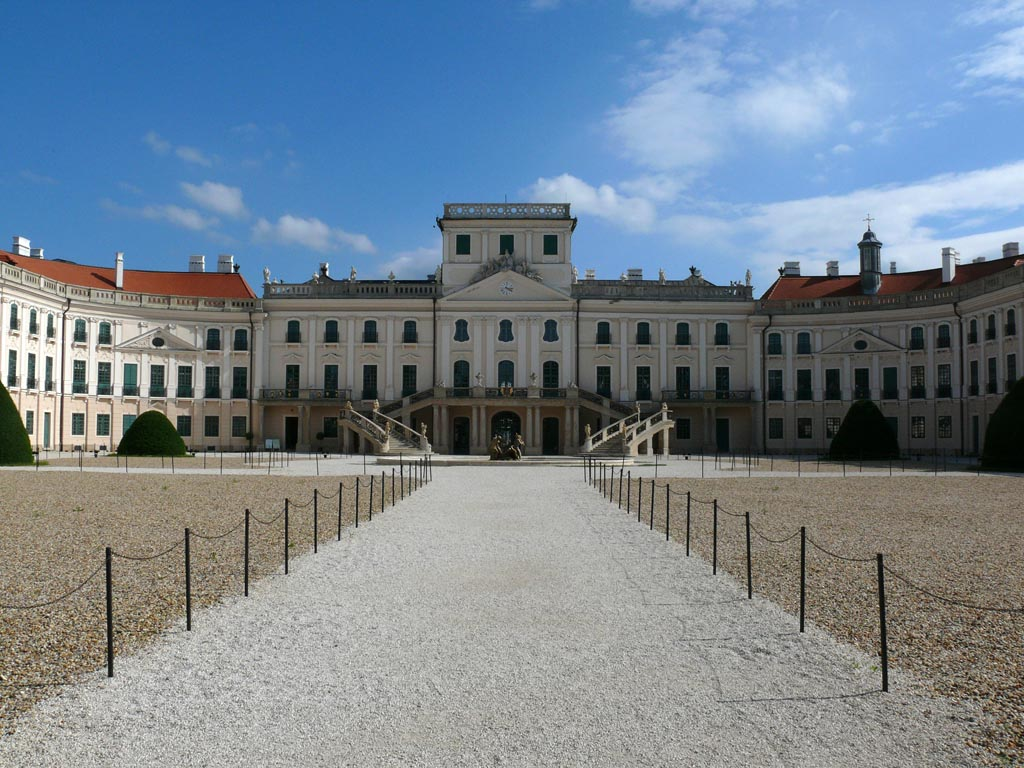
Eszterháza Palace, Hungary (1681–1945)

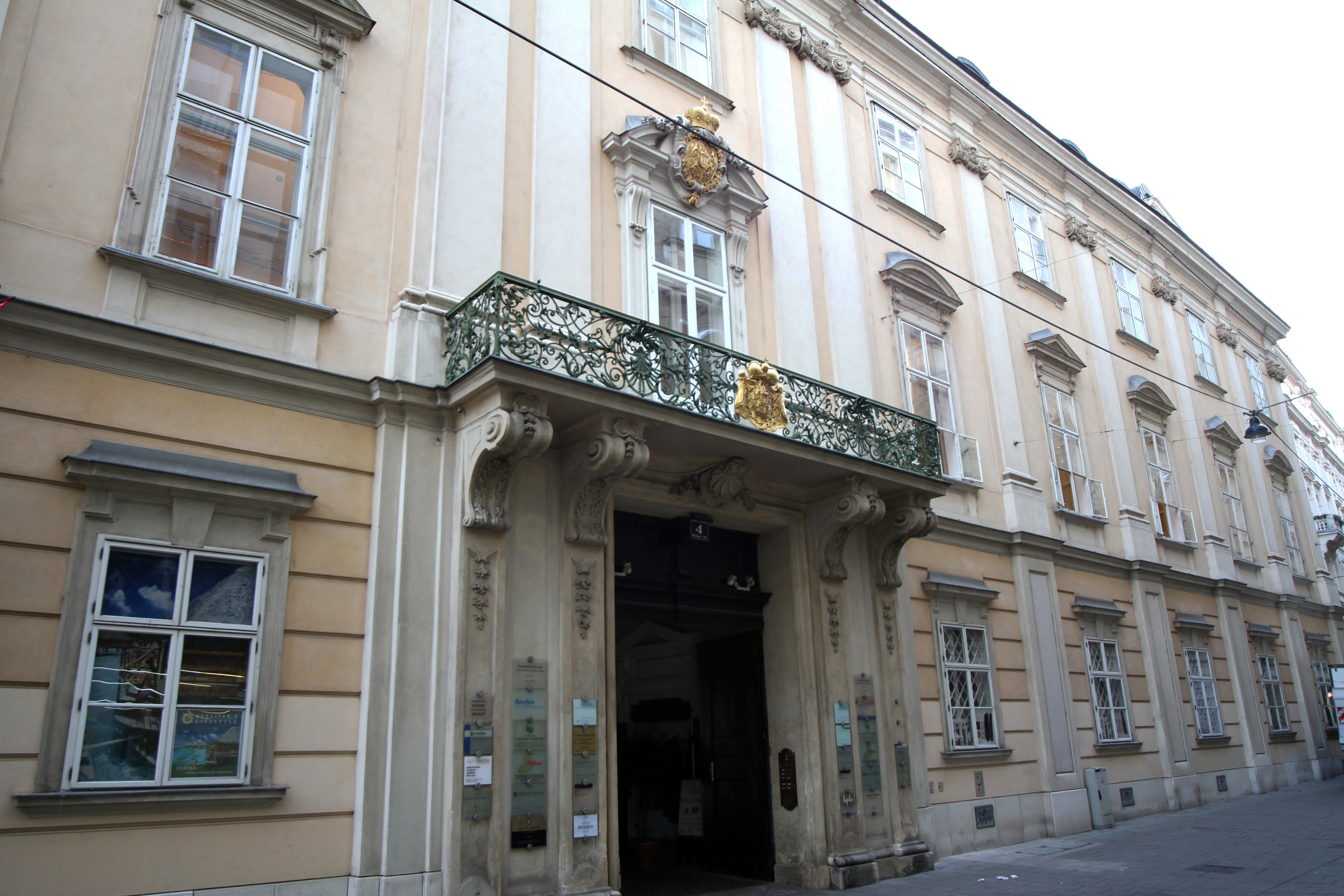
Palais Esterházy, Vienna, Austria (1685–present)

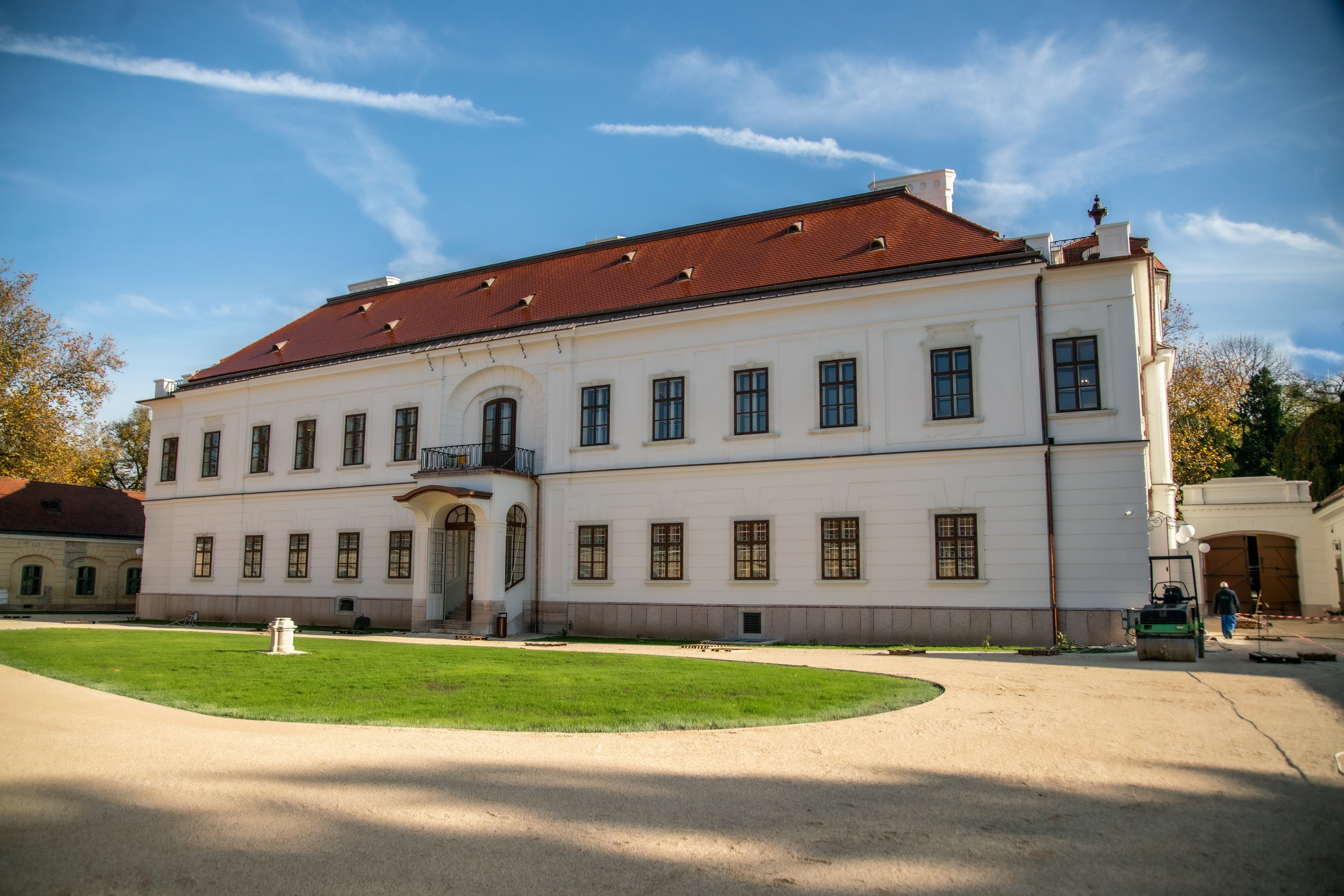
Tata Castle, Hungary (1727–1945)

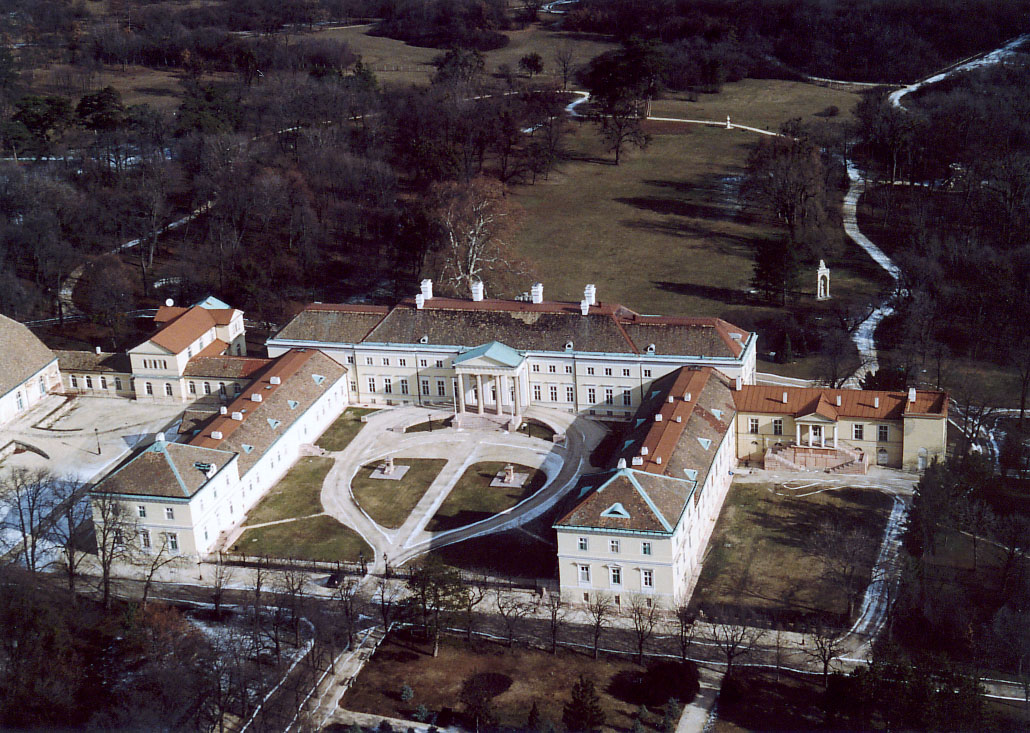
Csákvár Castle, Hungary (1778–1945)

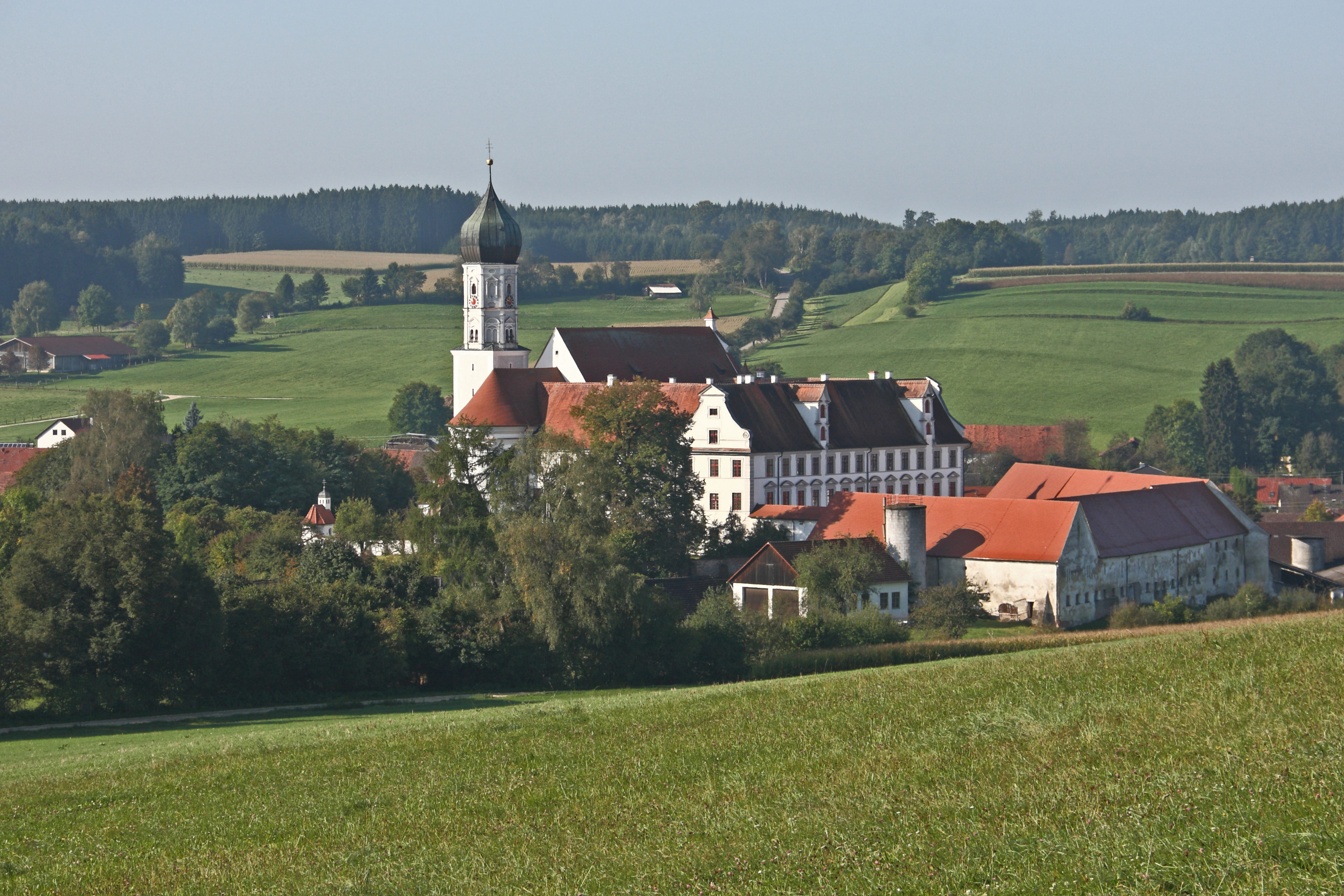
Former monastery at Edelstetten in Neuburg an der Kammel, Bavaria (1804–present)

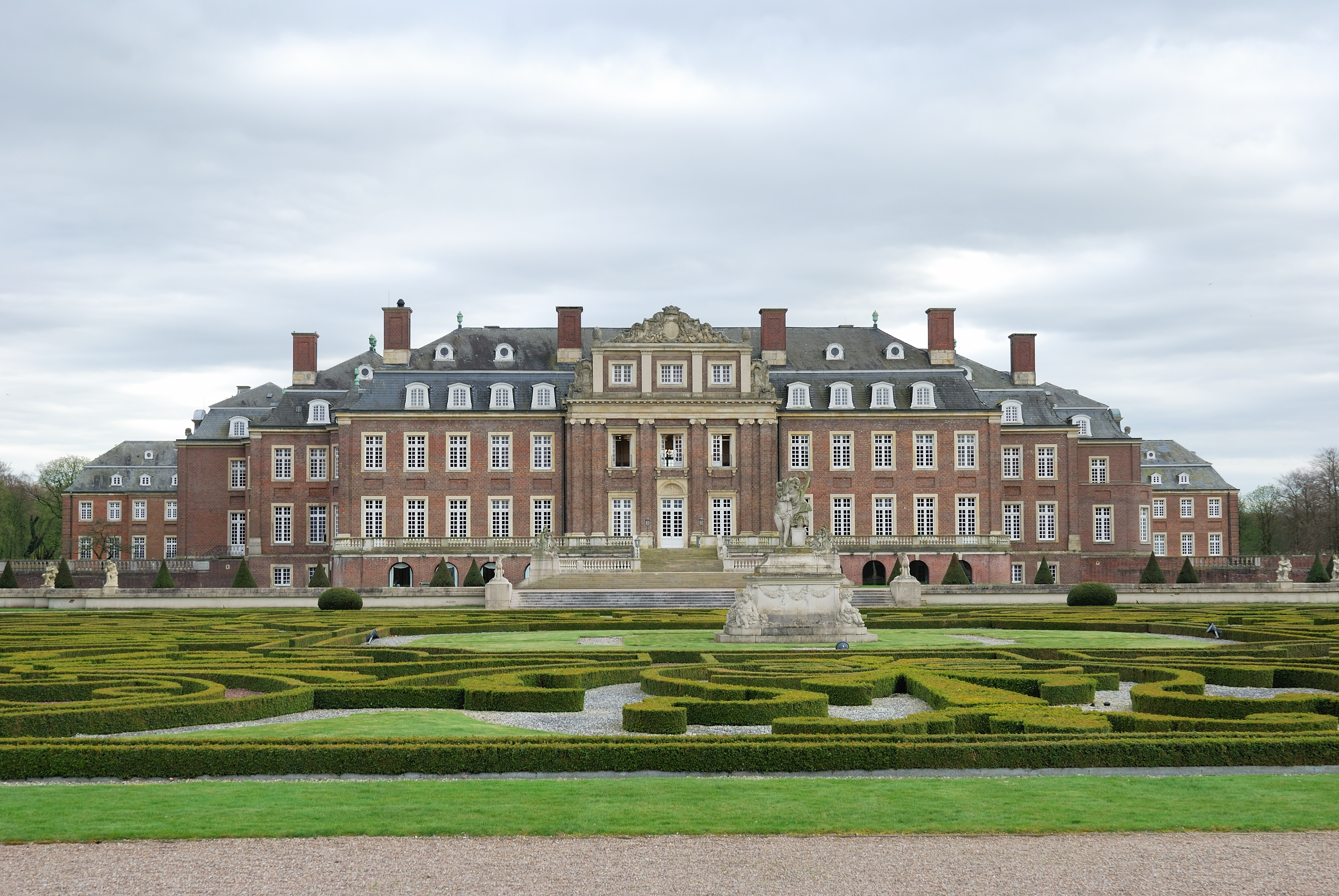
Schloss Nordkirchen, Westphalia (owned by the family in the 19th century)

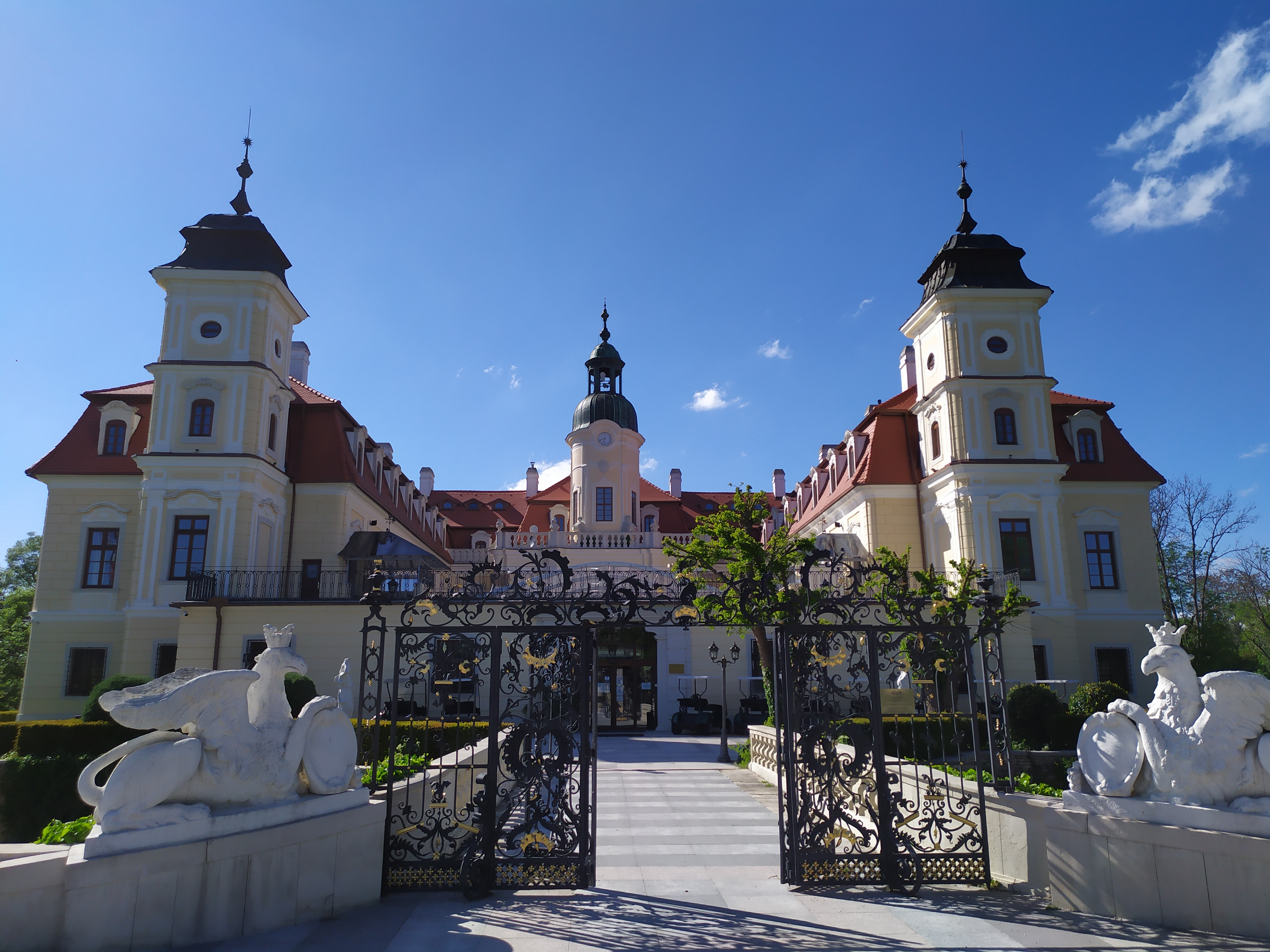
Cseklész, today in Slovakia (Bernolákovo)

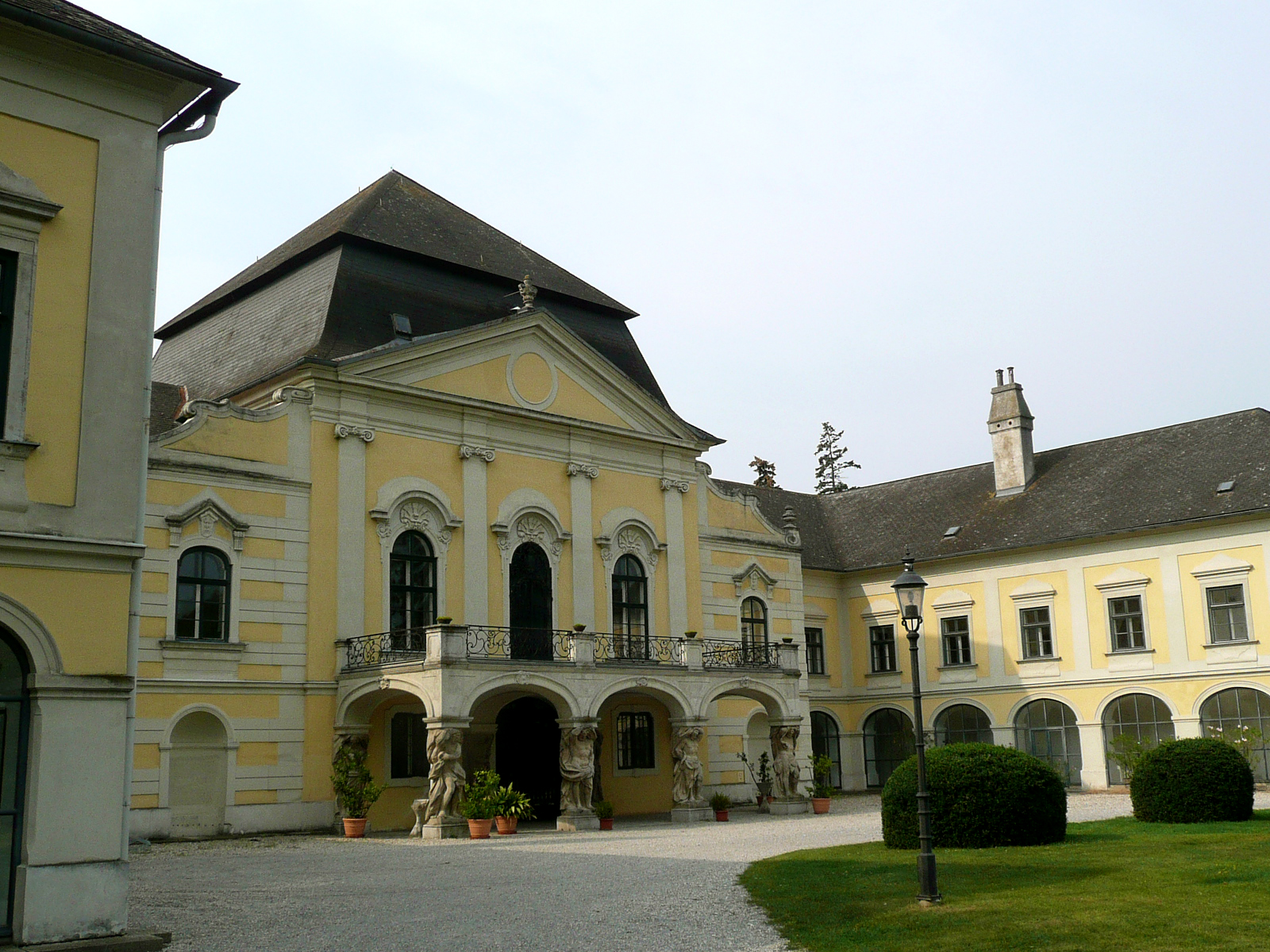
Köpcsény, today in Austria (Kittsee)

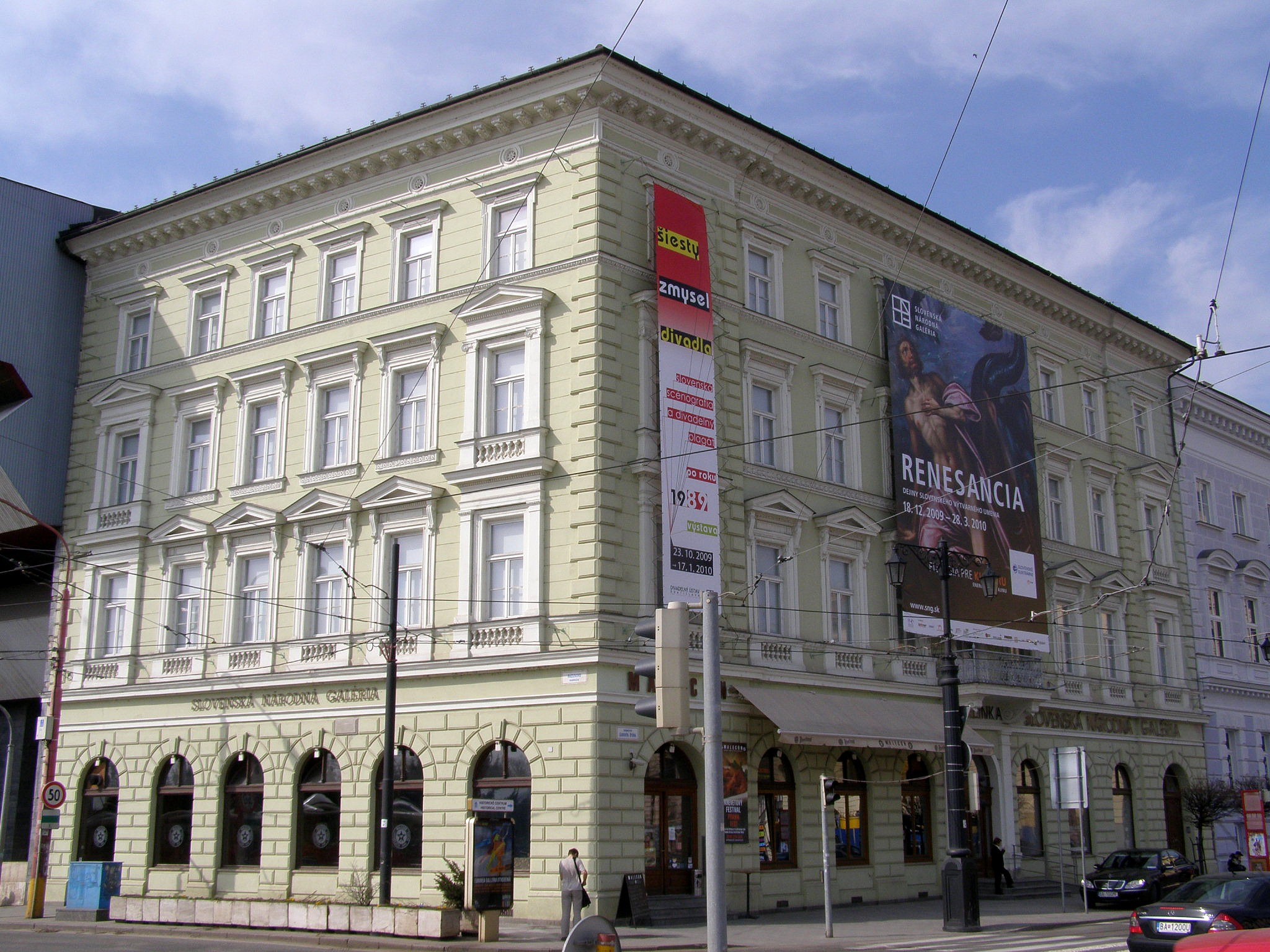
Esterházy Palace, Bratislava, Slovakia

== In fiction ==
Herman Melville references the family's wealth in chapter 29 of Mardi (1849): "But as sailors are mostly foundlings and castaways, and carry all their kith and kin in their arms and their legs, there hardly ever appears any heir-at-law to claim their estate; seldom worth inheriting, like Esterhazy's."

Avram Davidson's Doctor Eszterhazy stories are set in a fictitious ramshackle Balkan empire resembling Austria-Hungary, but with Ruritanian characteristics.

The character Toby Esterhase, who appears in several of John le Carré's spy novels, either is or pretends to be a member of the Esterházy family.

The character Helen Pendergast (deceased) and her brother Judson Esterházy (deceased) appear in the Special Agent Pendergast series by Douglas Preston and Lincoln Child.

== See also ==
- Esterhazy Madonna
- Esterházy torte
- Esterhazya
- Hungarian nobility
- List of titled noble families in the Kingdom of Hungary
