= Fertőd =

- Town
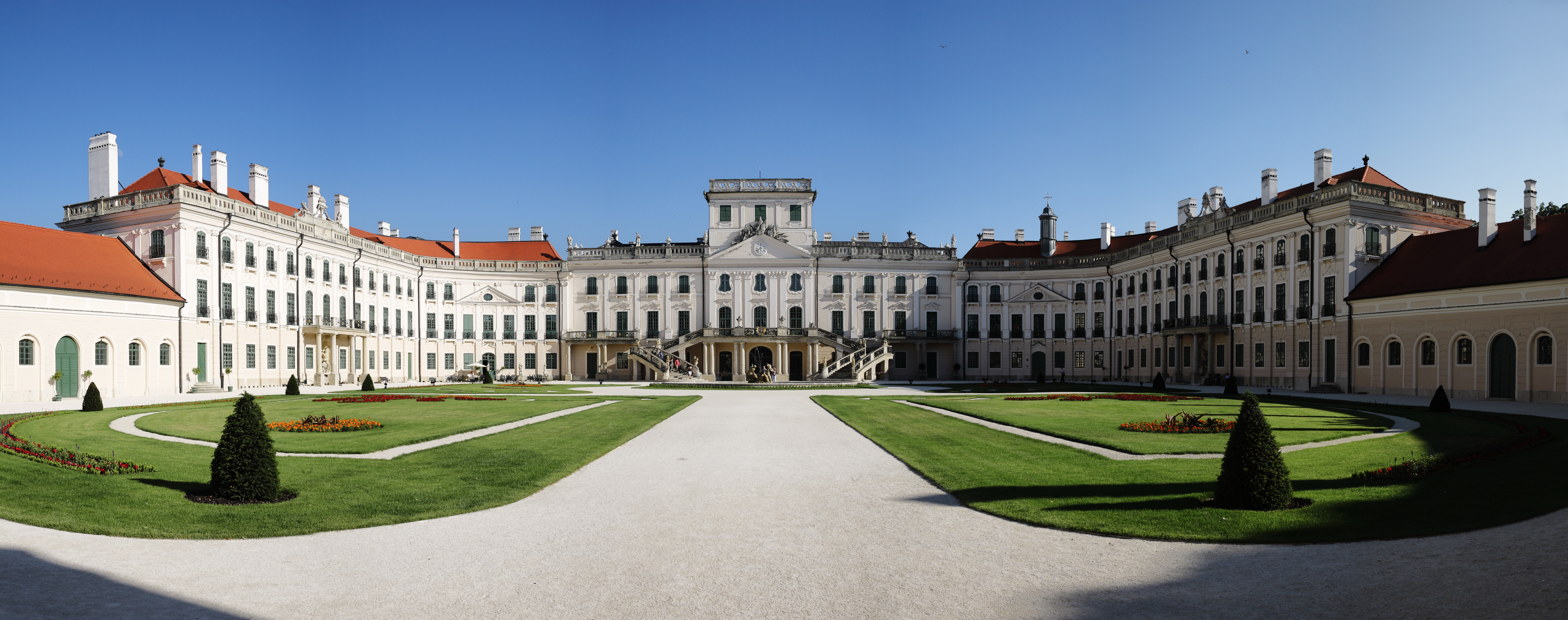
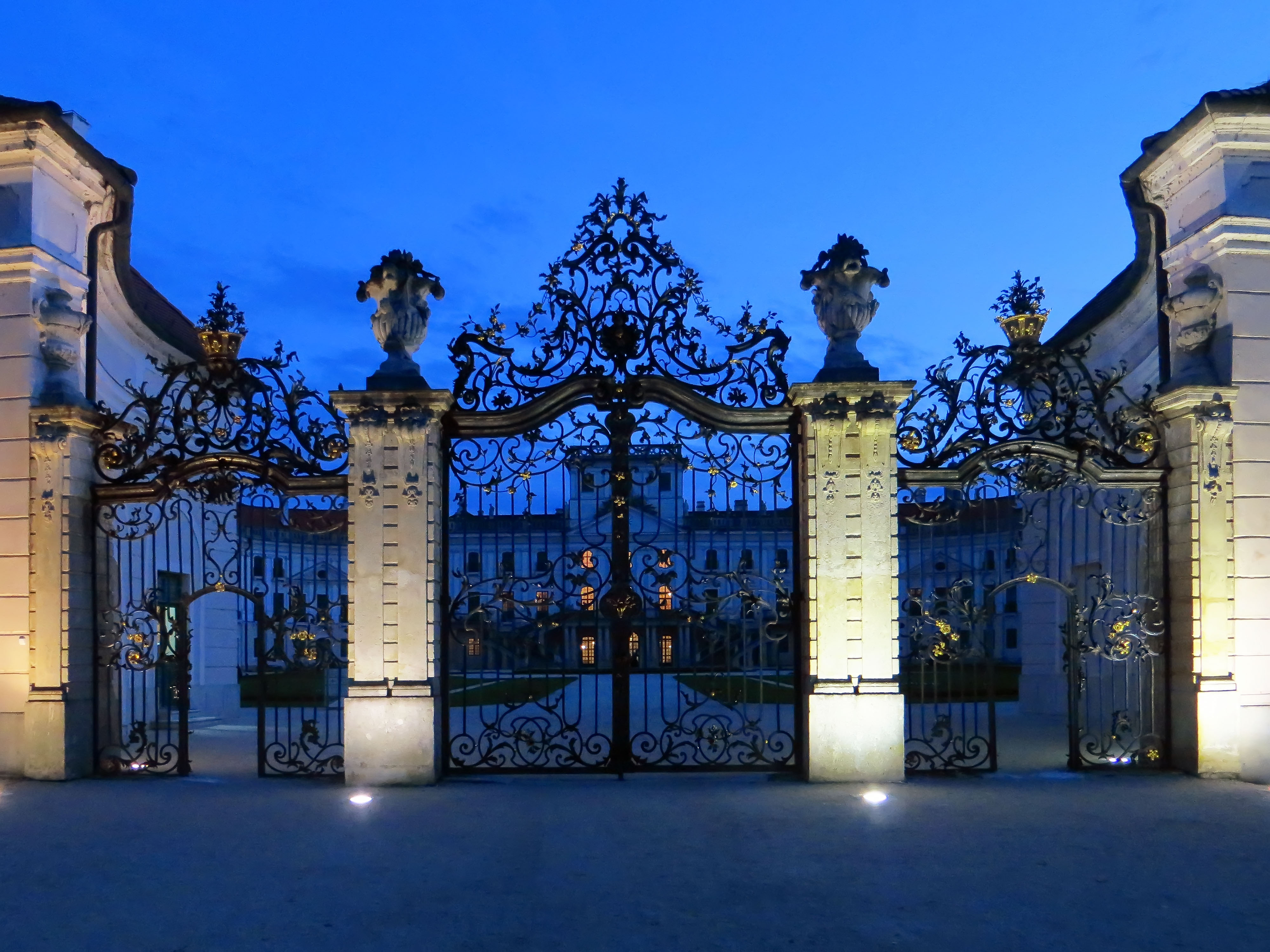
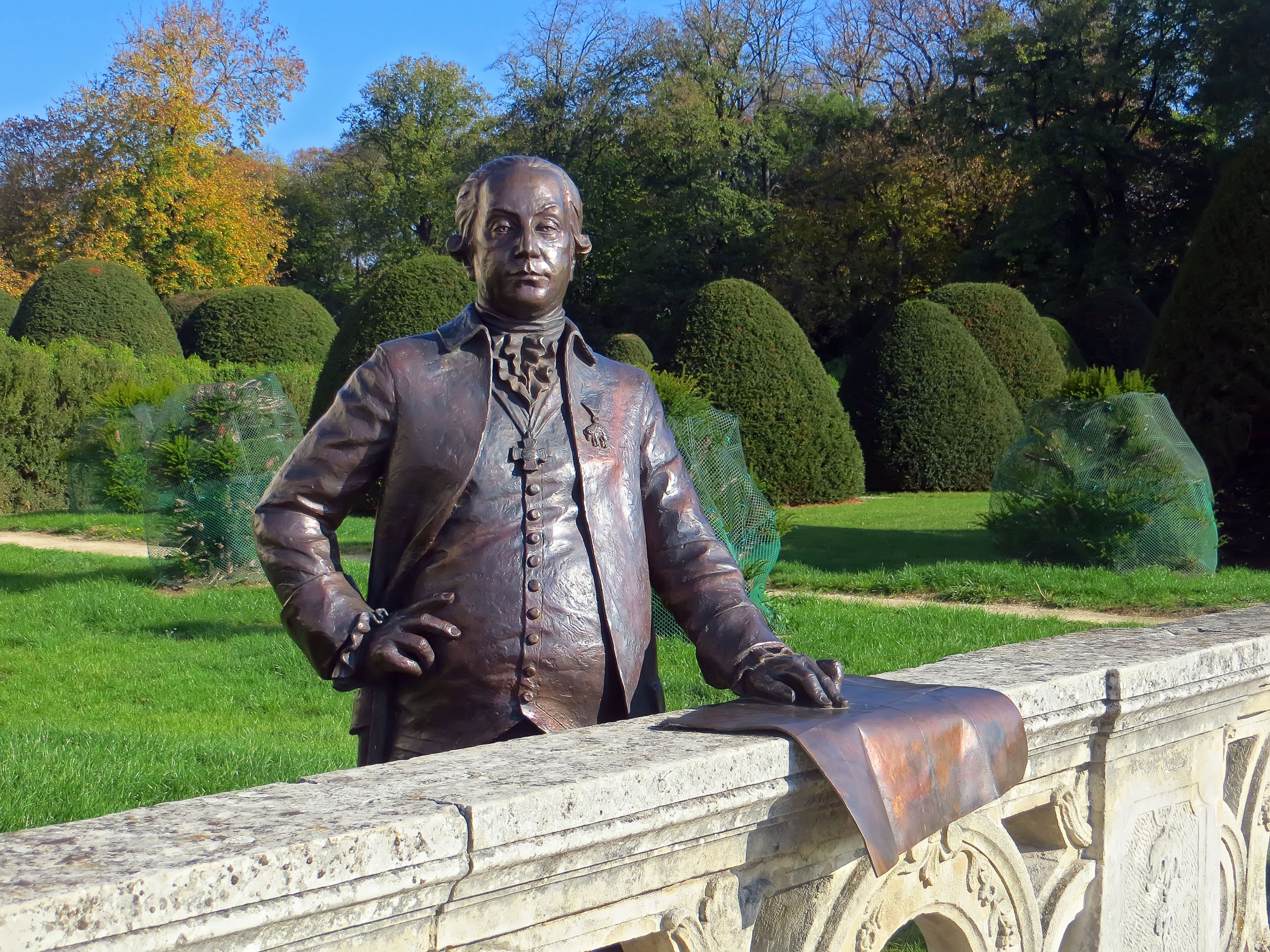
- Descending, from top: Esterházy Palace, gate of the Palace, and statue of Prince Nikolaus I

- Flag Coat of arms

- Location of Győr-Moson-Sopron county in Hungary

- Location of Fertőd
- Coordinates: 47.61866°N 16.88144°E
- Country: Hungary
- County: Győr-Moson-Sopron
- District: Sopron

Area
  - Total: 48.54 km^{2} (18.74 sq mi)

Population (2015)
  - Total: 3,360
  - Density: 69.2/km^{2} (179/sq mi)
- Time zone: UTC+1 (CET)
  - Summer (DST): UTC+2 (CEST)
- Postal code: 9431
- Area code: (+36) 99
- Website: www.fertod.hu

Fertőd (Hungarian pronunciation: [ˈfɛrtøːd]) is a town in the Győr-Moson-Sopron county of Hungary, not far from Austria. Fertőd was formed when the towns of Eszterháza and Süttör were unified, in 1950.

It is the location of one of Hungary's best known palaces, Eszterháza, which was built in the 1760s by Prince Prince Nikolaus I Esterházy of the influential Esterházy family.

Prince Nikolaus IV Esterházy († 1920), his wife Margit († 1910), their son Anton († 1944) and other family members are buried in the Esterházy family cemetery in Fertőd, which is located in a small park around two kilometers northeast of the Eszterháza Palace (position: 47°38′08.1″N 16°53′04.8″E).

== Twin towns — sister cities ==
Fertőd is twinned with:

- Millingen aan de Rijn, Netherlands

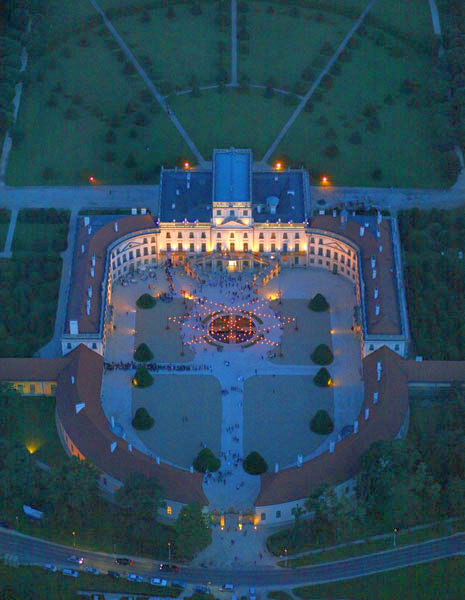
The palace at night
