= Melinda Esterházy =

Hungarian ballet dancer (1920-2014)

Melinda Esterházy (born Melinda Ottrubay, May 24, 1920, in Budapest – August 27, 2014, in Eisenstadt) was a Hungarian-Austrian landowner and former ballet dancer. She was the wife of Prince Paul Esterházy, an Austro-Hungarian nobleman of the Esterházy family.

Esterházy inherited Paul's wealth after his death. Since she had no children, she created several foundations to preserve the cultural and historic heritage of the Esterházy family, with the historic family seat Schloss Esterházy in Eisenstadt as the centre of all activities.

== Life ==
=== Early life and marriage ===
Her parents were Dezsö (or Demeter) Ottrubay, president of the Budapest Higher Regional Court, and his wife Rose, née von Schmidt. She had a younger brother, Josef Ottrubay (1926–2015), who lived as a university lecturer in Lucerne.

Family tree of the Esterházy family

After high school, she starred in two feature films in 1939. At the age of 24 Melinda Ottrubay was appointed prima ballerina assoluta of the Budapest Opera.

On August 3, 1946, Melinda Ottrubay married Prince Paul V Esterházy de Galántha in Budapest. The marriage remained childless.

=== Title and name ===
In 1921, when today's Burgenland was added to the Republic of Austria, Paul opted for Hungarian citizenship. This left him with the Hungarian personal status and with it his princely title and his nobility name, which he would have had to do without if he had opted for Austrian citizenship due to the nobility in Austria that was repealed in April 1919. After the Hungarian monarchy ceased to exist at the beginning of 1947 and Hungary had become a people's democracy, the nobility and denominations in Hungary was abolished. Thus the names of the couple in Hungary and internationally became Paul Esterházy and Melinda Esterházy.

=== Escape from Hungary and further life ===
In 1949 Paul Esterházy was sentenced to fifteen years in prison during the show trial of Cardinal József Mindszenty. It was only in 1954 that Melinda was allowed to visit her husband in Kőbánya prison after having been without news of him for over four years. He was finally released on October 30, 1956, in the course of the Hungarian uprising. Paul and Melinda Esterházy fled to Austria on November 1, 1956, in a car disguised as a Red Cross vehicle via the Nickelsdorf border crossing. Her escape was planned and organized by the Viennese lawyer Kurt Werner and the Burgenland member of the National Council, Franz Strobl. They traveled on to Switzerland, where they lived in Zurich until Paul's death in 1989.

=== Death and posthumous exhibition ===
Esterházy died on August 27, 2014, in Eisenstadt in the presence of her family. On October 15, 2016, the exhibition Melinda Esterházy: "Life has given me a lot" opened at Esterházy Palace in Eisenstadt, showing both her career as a prima ballerina and her life at the side of Prince Paul V. Esterházy.

== Career ==
She started dancing as a young girl and later became a dancer with the Budapest Opera House.

Esterházy also acted in movies. She is best known for her role as Éva in Hungary's Revival (1939). She portrayed a ballet prima donna in the movie Pénz áll a házhoz (1939).
