= Tristan Azbej =

Hungarian politician

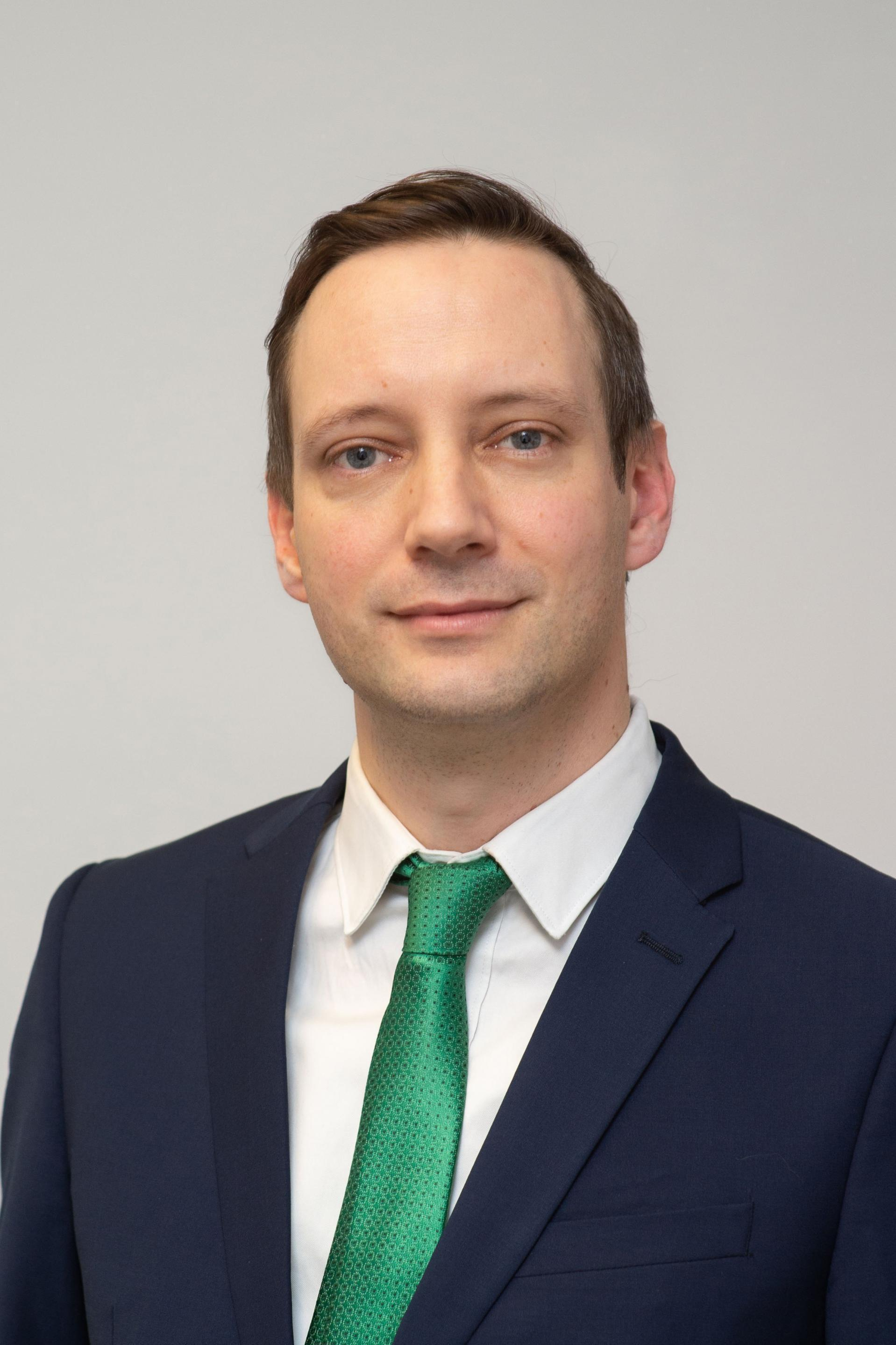
- Born: March 4, 1979 (age 47)
- Office: State Secretary for the Aid of Persecuted Christians and the Hungary Helps Program, Prime Minister's Office; Vice President of the KDNP - Christian Democratic People's Party
- Political party: KDNP - Christian Democratic People's Party (Hungary)

Tristan Azbej (born March 4, 1979) is a Hungarian politician, the state secretary for the aid of persecuted Christians and the Hungary Helps Program. He is also the vice president of the KDNP - Christian Democratic People's Party (Hungary).

== Life ==
His father is Hungarian of distant Armenian descent and his mother is French. He earned a master's degree in geology from Eötvös Loránd University in 2002. He then went on to complete a Ph.D. in geosciences at Virginia Tech, graduating in 2006.

He entered politics in 2010, working as a policy advisor for the FIDESZ-KDNP Parliamentary Group. Between 2012 and 2013 he worked as a policy advisor for the Prime Minister's Office. From 2013 to 2017 he served as the science and technology attaché at the Embassy of Hungary in Tel Aviv.

In 2017 he took the position of head of department at the Deputy State Secretariat for the Aid of Persecuted Christians at the Ministry of Human Capacities. Later in the same year he became the deputy state secretary for the aid of persecuted Christians. Since 2018 he has been serving as the state secretary for the aid of persecuted Christians and for the Hungary Helps Program at the Prime Minister's Office. In this role he has been coordinating the humanitarian efforts of the Government of Hungary and has had numerous public appearances advocating for freedom of religion

He was elected vice president of KDNP in 2020.
