= Countess Orsolya Esterházy of Galántha =

Hungarian noblewoman

Orsolya Esterházy
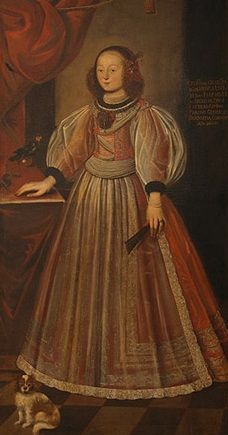
- Countess Orsolya Esterházy, wife of Paul I, Prince Esterházy

Countess Esterházy of Galántha
- Tenure: 7 February 1655 – 31 March 1682
- Born: 7 March 1641; Lakompak, Kingdom of Hungary
- Died: 31 March 1682 (aged 41); Kismarton, Kingdom of Hungary
- Spouse: Paul I, 1st Prince Esterházy of Galántha
- Issue: 19
Names
- Countess Orsolya Esterházy of Galantha
- House: House of Esterházy
- Father: Count István Esterházy
- Mother: Countess Erzsébet Thurzó

Countess Orsolya Esterházy of Galantha (7 March 1641 in Lakompak, Kingdom of Hungary – 31 March 1682 in Kismarton, Kingdom of Hungary), was a member of the Esterházy, the only daughter of Count István Esterházy and Countess Erzsébet Thurzó, granddaughter of Nikolaus, Count Esterházy. Through her marriage to her uncle, Pál Esterházy, she became countess of Galanta.

== Family and early life ==
Orsolya Esterházy was born on March 7, 1641, in Lakompak (now Lackenbach), as a member of the older branch of the Esterházy family. Her parents were the papal castle captain István Esterházy and Countess Erzsébet Thurzó. Her paternal grandparents were Nikolaus, Count Esterházy and his first wife, Baroness Orsolya Dersffy de Szerdahely, while her maternal grandparents were Count Imre Thurzó de Bethlenfalva and Krisztina Nyáry (also the second wife of Count Nikolaus, her paternal grandfather).

On February 7, 1655, at the age of only fourteen, Orsolya married her own paternal uncle, Palatine Pál Esterházy, in Kismarton. A total of nineteen children were born from the marriage, eight of whom reached adulthood. Their children:

- Prince Miklós Antal Esterházy of Galántha (1655–1695)
- Count Pál Esterházy of Galántha (1657–1664)
- Countess Katalin Esterházy of Galántha (1659–1664)
- Count István József Esterházy of Galántha (1660–1669)
- Prince László Ignac Esterházy of Galántha (1662–1689)
- Princess Krisztina Esterházy of Galántha (1663–1732)
- Count Elek Domokos Esterházy of Galántha (1664–1673)
- Count Ferenc Agoston Esterházy of Galántha (1666–1673)
- Countess Ilona Esterházy of Galántha (1667–1681)
- Count János Benedek Esterházy of Galántha (1668–1683)
- Princess Orsolya Esterházy of Galántha (1670–after 1696)
- Michael I, 2nd Prince Esterházy of Galántha (1671–1721)
- Count György Bernat Esterházy of Galántha (1672–1672)
- Prince Gábor Esterházy of Galántha (1673–1704)
- Count Pál Esterházy of Galántha (1675–1683)
- Princess Anna Julia Esterházy of Galántha (1676–1700)
- Count Imre Esterházy of Galántha (1677–1677)
- Princess Anna Terézia Esterházy of Galántha (1679–after 1692)
- Prince Adam Esterházy of Galántha (1680–1720)

Orsolya Esterházy died in Kismarton on March 31, 1682, at the age of only forty-one. Her husband, Pál Esterházy, laid his wife Orsolya to rest in a glass coffin in the family tomb in Frakno. After his death, however, Prince Pál remarried five months after Orsolya's death. His second wife was the sister of Prince Imre Thököly, Countess Éva Thököly of Késmárk, with whom he had two more children.
