= Erzsébet Thurzó =

Hungarian noblewoman

- Countess of Bethlenfalva
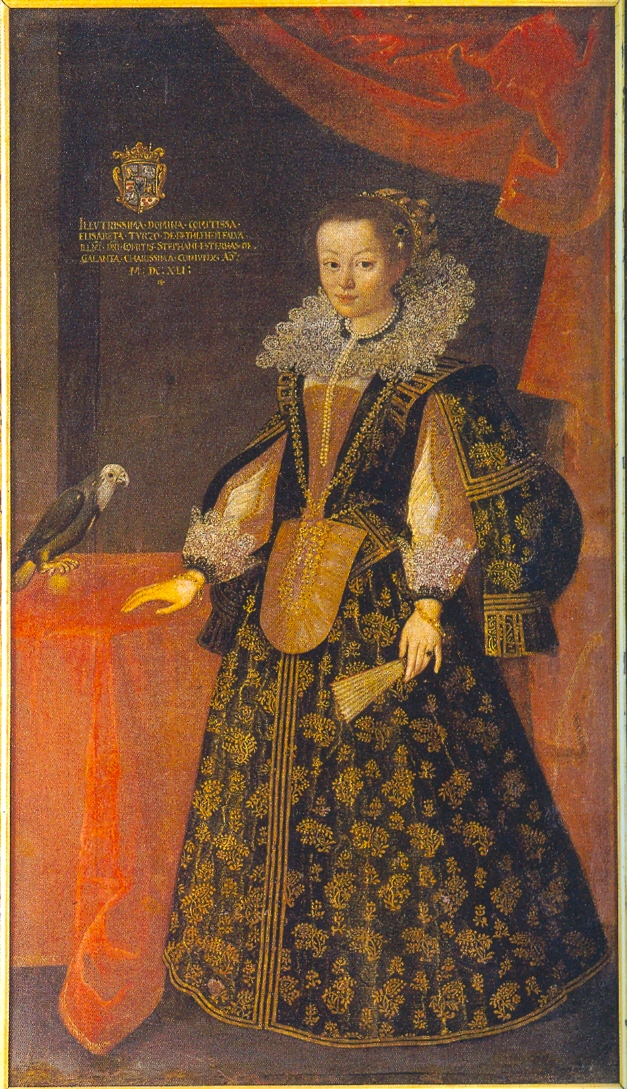
- Full name: Countess Erzsébet Thurzó de Bethlenfalva
- Born: 20 February 1621; Nagybiccse, Kingdom of Hungary (today: Bytča, Slovakia)
- Died: 4 July 1642 (aged 21); Lakompak, Kingdom of Hungary (today: Lackenbach, Austria)
- Noble family: House of Thurzó; House of Esterházy
- Spouse: Count István Esterházy de Galántha (1638–1641)
- Issue: Orsolya
- Father: Count Imre Thurzó de Bethlenfalva
- Mother: Baroness Krisztina Nyáry de Bedegh

Countess Erzsébet Thurzó de Bethlenfalva (20 February 1621 – 4 July 1642) was a Hungarian noblewoman, daughter of Count Imre Thurzó and Baroness Krisztina Nyáry.

== Marriage ==
Countess Erzsébet married to Count István Esterházy (1616–1641), son of Palatine Nikolaus, Count Esterházy and Baroness Orsolya Dersffy, on 26 September 1638 in Kismarton (today: Eisenstadt, Austria). Palatine Nikolaus (Miklós) was the second husband of Baroness Nyáry, Erzsébet's mother. Countess Erzsébet and Count István had a daughter:

- Orsolya (7 March 1641 – 31 March 1682), who married to her own uncle, Paul I, Prince Esterházy on 7 February 1655.

== Sources ==
- Miklós Kubinyi: Bethlenfalvi gróf Thurzó Imre 1598–1621, Budapest, Méhner Vilmos kiadása, 1888.
