= Imre Thurzó =

Hungarian aristocrat

- Count of Bethlenfalva
- Full name: Count Imre Thurzó de Bethlenfalva
- Born: 11 September 1598; Nagybiccse, Kingdom of Hungary (today: Bytča, Slovakia)
- Died: 19 October 1621 (aged 23); Nikolsburg, Holy Roman Empire (today: Mikulov, Czech Republic)
- Noble family: House of Thurzó
- Spouse: Baroness Krisztina Nyáry de Bedegh (1618–1621)
- Issue: Erzsébet
- Father: Count György Thurzó de Bethlenfalva
- Mother: Baroness Erzsébet Czobor de Czoborszentmihály

Count Imre Thurzó de Bethlenfalva (11 September 1598 – 19 October 1621) was a Hungarian aristocrat, son of Palatine György Thurzó, who served as Perpetual Ispán (Count; comes) of Árva County between 1616 and 1621. Count Imre also functioned as Rector of the University of Wittenberg from 1616 to 1621. He was the last male member of the prestigious Thurzó family.

== Biography ==
He was born in Nagybiccse, Trencsén County on 11 September 1598. His parents were György Thurzó, Palatine of Hungary and Erzsébet Czobor, daughter of Imre Czobor, who served as Palatinal Governor of Hungary between 1572 and 1581. As the only surviving son of Palatine Thurzó, he received careful and thorough education: firstly in the parental home, then at the University of Wittenberg. His close schoolmate was Juraj V Zrinski, future Ban of Croatia.

On Christmas Eve of 1616, György Thurzó died at the age of 49, thus Count Imre inherited the Thurzó prosperity and became Count of Árva. He was appointed rector of the Wittenberg university in that same year.

Count Imre, as a Lutheran magnate, supported Gabriel Bethlen, Prince of Transylvania, who fought against the Habsburgs and Ferdinand II in the Thirty Years' War. He also had a significant role in the election Gabriel as King of Hungary. He served as envoy of Gabriel to the Bohemian nobility. He was one of the signatory of the Peace of Nikolsburg in 1621. He died suddenly there on 19 October 1621.

=== Marriage ===
Thurzó's wife was Baroness Krisztina Nyáry (1604–1641), daughter of Pál Nyáry, the castellan of Várad (Nagyvárad; today: Oradea, Romania), Ispán (Count; comes) of Bihar and Közép-Szolnok Counties. They married in Helmec on 15 November 1618. The marriage was highly luxurious during that time, which was celebrated by Péter Alvinci. They had two daughters:

- Erzsébet (20 February 1621 – 4 July 1642), married to Count István Esterházy (1616–1641) on 26 July 1638, the eldest son of Krisztina's second husband, Count Nikolaus and Baroness Orsolya Dersffy
- Krisztina (25 April 1622 – 22 March 1632), died young

After the death of Imre Thurzó, Baroness Krisztina converted to Roman Catholicism from Lutheranism and married Count Nikolaus (Miklós) Esterházy (1583–1645) for the second time in Szucsány (today: Sučany, Slovakia) on 21 July 1624. This marriage was established the Esterházy family's property.

== Sources ==
- Miklós Kubinyi: Bethlenfalvi gróf Thurzó Imre 1598–1621, Budapest, Méhner Vilmos kiadása, 1888.
- Zoltán Ferenczi: Rimay János 1573–1631, Budapest, Magyar Történelmi Társulat, 1911.
