= István Esterházy (1616–1641) =

- Count of Galántha
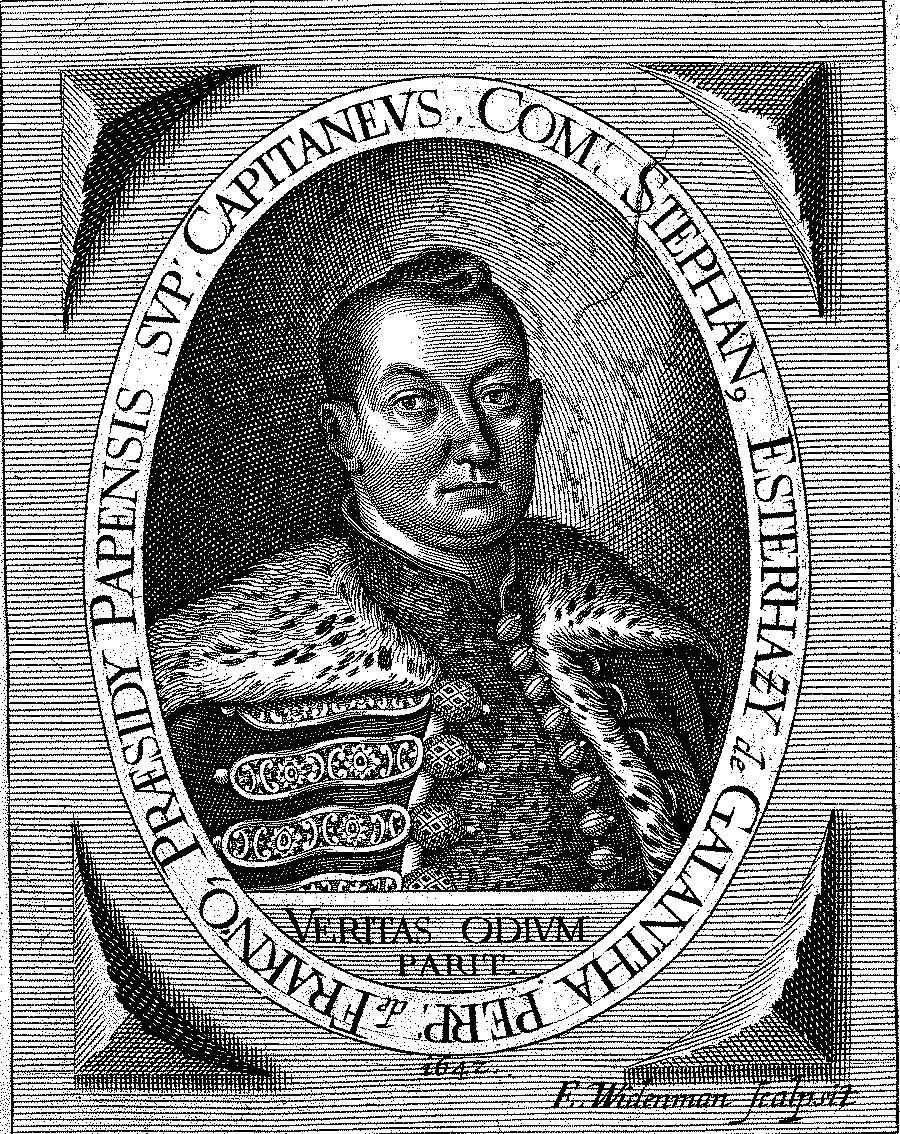
- Full name: Count István Esterházy de Galántha
- Born: 27 February 1616; Munkács, Kingdom of Hungary (today: Mukachevo, Ukraine)
- Died: 4 July 1641 (aged 25); Vienna
- Noble family: Esterházy
- Spouse: Countess Erzsébet Thurzó de Bethlenfalva (1638–1641)
- Issue: Orsolya
- Father: Count Miklós Esterházy de Galántha
- Mother: Baroness Orsolya Dersffy de Szerdahely

Count István Esterházy de Galántha (English: Count Stephen Esterházy of Galántha; 27 February 1616 – 4 July 1641) was a member of the wealthy Hungarian Esterházy family, eldest son of Palatine Nicholas Esterházy and his first wife, Baroness Orsolya Dersffy.

His father received the title of Count in 1626 by Emperor-King Ferdinand II, therefore his descendants also could make use of title. Count István died in 1641, when his father was still alive. His younger brother Ladislaus became head of the family in 1645.

== Family ==
Count István married to Countess Erzsébet Thurzó (1621–1642), granddaughter of Palatine György Thurzó, on 26 September 1638 in Kismarton (today: Eisenstadt, Austria). Erzsébet Thurzó's mother was Baroness Krisztina Nyáry de Bedegh, the second wife of Count István's father. They had a daughter:

- Orsolya (7 March 1641 – 31 March 1682), who married to her own uncle, Paul I, Prince Esterházy on 7 February 1655.
