= Krisztina Nyáry =

- Baroness of Bedegh
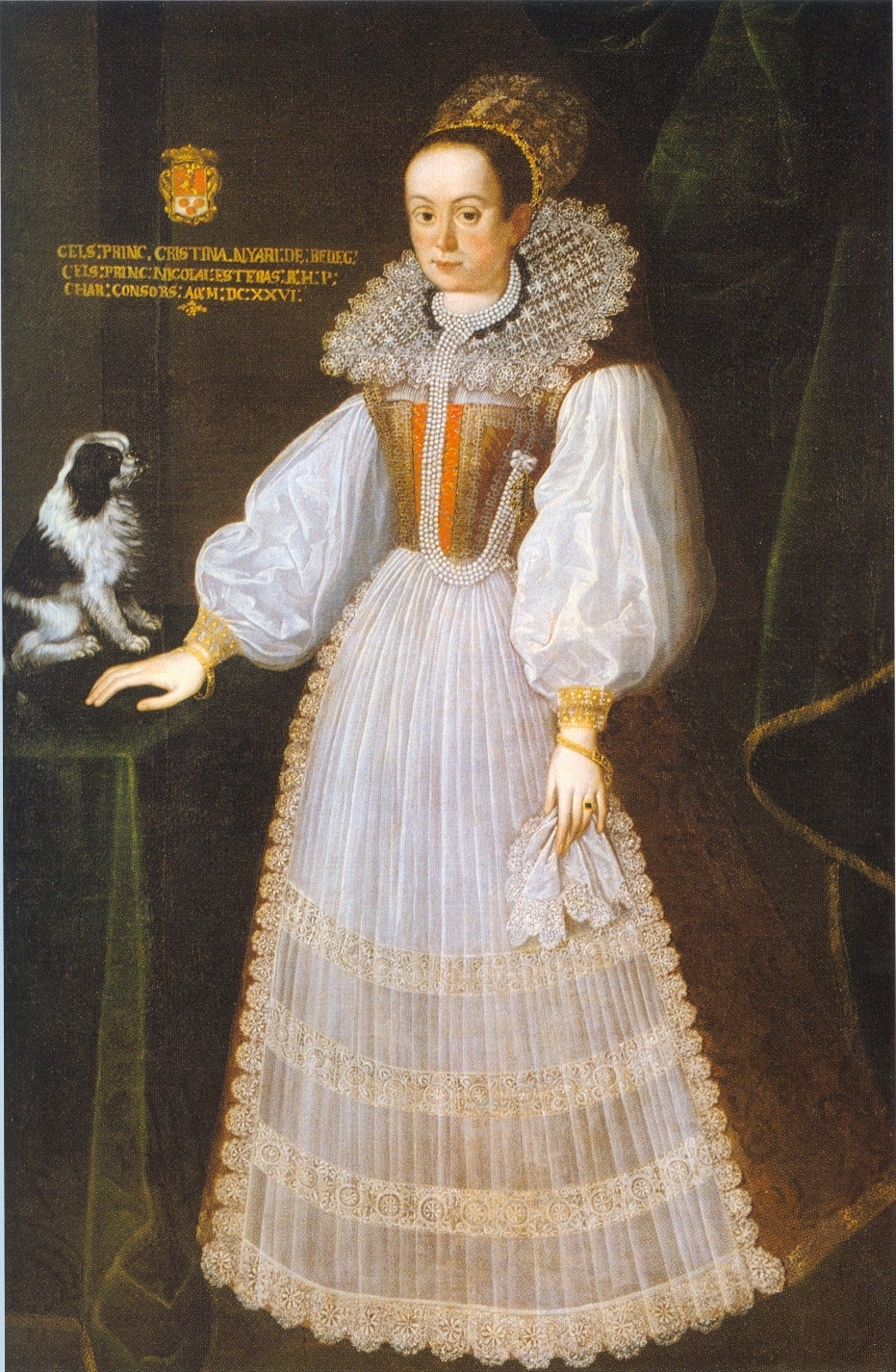
- Full name: Baroness Krisztina Nyáry de Bedegh
- Born: 31 October 1604; Kisvárda, Kingdom of Hungary
- Died: 17 February 1641 (aged 36); Sempte, Kingdom of Hungary (today: Šintava, Slovakia)
- Noble family: House of Nyáry; House of Thurzó; House of Esterházy
- Spouses: Count Imre Thurzó de Bethlenfalva (1618–1621); Count Miklós Esterházy de Galántha (1624–1641)
- Issue: twelve children, including: László; Pál; Anna Júlia
- Father: Baron Pál Nyáry de Bedegh
- Mother: Katalin Várday de Kisvárda

Baroness Krisztina Nyáry de Bedegh (31 October 1604 – 17 February 1641) was the daughter of Baron Pál Nyáry and Katalin Várday de Kisvárda. She was the second wife of Palatine Nikolaus, Count Esterházy. Her son, among others, was Paul I, Prince Esterházy.

== Life ==
She was born on 31 October 1604 as the youngest child of Pál Nyáry, the castellan of Várad (Nagyvárad; today: Oradea, Romania), Ispán (Count; comes) of Bihar and Közép-Szolnok Counties.

=== First marriage ===
Baroness Krisztina married to Count Imre Thurzó, only son of Palatine György Thurzó. Imre was the last male member of the Thurzó family. Their wedding was held in Helmec on 15 November 1618. The marriage was highly luxurious during that time, which was celebrated by Péter Alvinci. They had two daughters:

- Erzsébet (20 February 1621 – 4 July 1642), married to Count István Esterházy (1616–1641) on 26 July 1638, the eldest son of Krisztina's second husband, Count Nikolaus and Baroness Orsolya Dersffy
- Krisztina (25 April 1622 – 22 March 1632), died young

=== Second marriage ===
Count Imre died suddenly in 1621, and as a result, the House of Thurzó became extinct in the male line. Krisztina converted to Roman Catholicism from Lutheranism. The widow, promising a rich heritage, married Count Nikolaus (Miklós) Esterházy (1583–1645) in Szucsány (today: Sučany, Slovakia) on 21 July 1624. The wedding ceremony was celebrated by Péter Pázmány, the Archbishop of Esztergom. The marriage produced the following children:

- Magdolna (19 September 1625 – 7 May 1627), died young
- László (31 December 1626 – 26 August 1652), Count Esterházy of Galántha (1645–1652), killed in the Battle of Vezekény
- Katalin (18 August 1628 – 13 March 1630), died young
- Anna Juliana (28 February 1630 – 22 January 1669), married to judge royal Franz III. Nádasdy, who participated in the Magnate conspiracy
- Mihály (19 February 1632 – 26 August 1633), died young
- Mária Krisztina (17 January 1634 – 5 April 1634), died as an infant
- Pál (7 September 1635 – 26 March 1713), Palatine of Hungary (since 1681), the first Prince Esterházy of Galántha (since 1687)
- Mária (2 February 1638 – 2 April 1684), married to Count György Drugeth de Homonna (1633–1661)
- Ferenc (17 February 1641 – 16 October 1683), castellan of Pápa, Imperial and Royal Chamberlain, participated in the Magnate conspiracy, his second wife was Countess Katalin Thököly, sister of Imre Thököly

The family's court chaplain was the Jesuit Mátyás (Matthias) Hajnal, who recommended his devotional book of Jesus' Heart, published in Vienna, 1629, to Krisztina Nyáry. That work is a precious memorial of the beginning of the Hungarian Baroque literature. Krisztina's diary is also a work of literary value.

Baroness Krisztina died on 17 February 1641, survived by her husband who did not remarry.

== Sources ==
- Arnold Ipolyi: Bedegi Nyáry Krisztina 1604-1641, Budapest, Méhner Vilmos kiadása, 1887
- Zsigmond Nyáry: Nyáry de Bedegh et Berencs, Budapest, 1996.
