= Seat of the 10 Lance-bearers =

European polity

Seat of the 10 Lance-bearers Tízlándzsás szék (Hungarian) Sedes X Lanceatorum (Latin)
- Seat of Szepes County
- 13th century – 1786; 1790–1803
- Capital: Spišský Štvrtok (until 15th century); Betlanovce (since 1768)
- History
  - Established: 13th century
  - First known mention in documentation: 7 June 1243
  - Diestablishment due to the reforms by King Joseph II: 1786
  - Reestablishment following the death of Joseph II: 1790
  - Diestablishment: 1803
- Contained within
  - Country: Kingdom of Hungary
  - County: Szepes
Preceded by	Succeeded by
Szepes County	Szepes County

The Seat of the 10 Lance-bearers, (Note: Hungarian: Tízlándzsás szék; Latin: Sedes X Lanceatorum) (Note: Also translated as Lancers) also known as the Upper Seat of the 10 Lance-bearers, (Note: Hungarian: Tíz Lándzsás Nemesek Felső Szék; Latin: Sedes Superior Decem Lanceatorum) the Szepes District of the Lance-bearers, (Note: Hungarian: Szepesi lándzsások kerülete) the Upper Seat, (Note: Hungarian: Felső szék; Latin: Sedes Superior) and the Minor County, (Note: Hungarian: Kisvármegye; Latin: Parvus Comitatus, Comitates Minor) was a seat, an autonomous administrative division, within the Szepes County, Kingdom of Hungary. It existed from the 13th century, before 1243, until 1786 and since 1790 until 1803. Since 1768 its capital was located in Betlanovce. It consisted of several exclaves of villages mostly inhabited by the ten-lanced nobility. Its official languages were Slovak, Hungarian and de facto Latin.

== History ==
Seat of the 10 Lance-bearers was a seat, an autonomous administrative division independent from the government of Szepes County, Kingdom of Hungary, within which it was located. It consisted of several exclaves of villages located mostly between Spišský Štvrtok, Poprad and Kežmarok. Additionally, it initially also included a few villages near Spiš Castle. The villages and settlements that were included within its territory were: Abrahámovce, Betlanovce, Čenčice, Čingov, Filice, Gánovce, Hadušovce, Hôrka, Hozelec, Kišovce, Komárovce, Levkovce, Machalovce, Miklušovce, Ondrej and Pikovce. Originally, it also included: Mečedelovce, Primovce, Urbanovce, Kúria Tyba, Čepanovce, Spišský Hrušov, Granč, Petrovce, Nemešany, Kazimírovce, Horanské and Arnutovce. The territory was populated by Germans, Hungarians and Slavs.

The origin of the seat remains unknown. According to some historians, the privileged population of the seat, could have been the descendants of soldiers meant to defend the borders of the Kingdom of Hungary, that originated from the region of Gemer or the population of Cumans. The first mention of the region comes from the document made on 7 June 1243. In the document, Béla IV, King of Hungary, had confirmed the privileges already held by the ten-lanced nobility. It includes the exemption from the tributes, taxes, tolls, and market fees in Szepes County. According to the law, the nobility members that owned the 4 estates bigger than 960 morgen, had to provide a lance-bearing squire with armor. In total, the nobility had to provide 10 lance-bearers. In comparison, each member of the nobility in the rest of the Szepes County had to provide one lance-bearer.

In 1785, as part of the reforms made by King Joseph II, all autonomous territories in Szepes County were meant to be abolished on 1 November 1785. However, as the government officials of the seat were opposed to this, the Seat of the 10 Lance-bearers continued to exist until the beginning of 1786. It was reestablished in 1790, following the death of Joseph II, and the abolishment of his reforms. The first council meeting of the reestablished seat was held on 16 March, and the first new officials were appointed on 12 May of the same year.

As the statues of the nobility had weakened, considering the high costs of upkeep of the seat officials and increasing pressure from the state, the inhabitants of the seat, who were by now mostly farmers, and their nobility rights were mostly symbolical at that point, begun considering abolishment of the seat. In 1801, it began negotiations with Szepes County, about possible incorporation into its administration. On 25 September 1802, its representatives had signed documents about the unification of two administrative divisions. The last council meeting took place on 10 January 1803, and on 26 April 1803, its representatives took place in the council meeting as part of Szepes County.
