= Gábor Esterházy =

Gábor Esterházy may refer to:

- Gábor Esterházy (1580–1626), son of Ferenc Esterházy
- Gábor Esterházy (1673–1704), son of Paul I, Prince Esterházy
