= House of Nyáry =

Hungarian noble house

House of Nyáry Bedeghi és Berencsi Nyáry Család
- Comital and Baronial dynasty
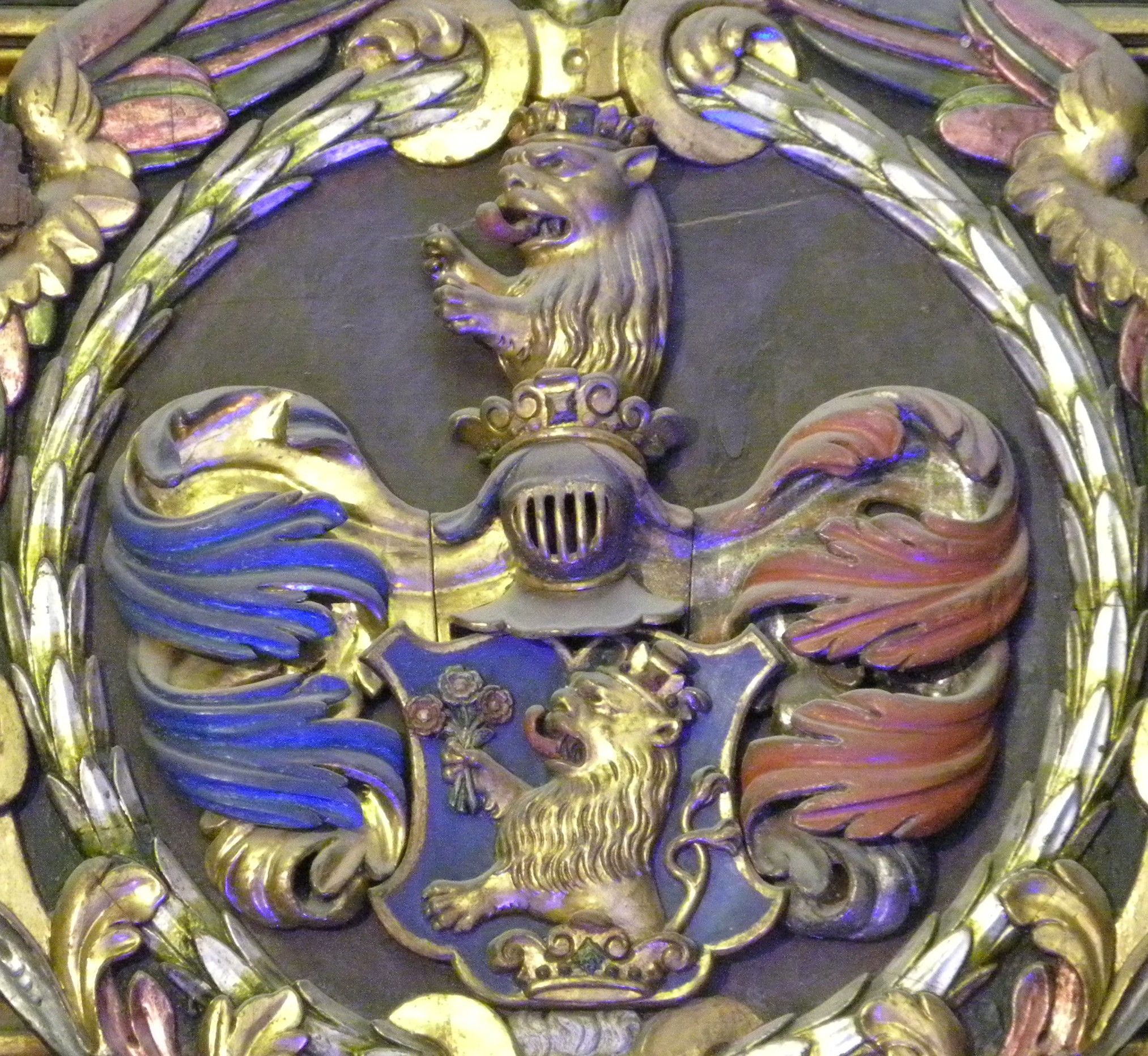
- Country: Kingdom of Hungary
- Founded: 1329
- Founder: János Nyáry

The House of Nyiri or Nyáry of Bedegh and Berencs (Hungarian: bedeghi és berencsi Nyáry család) is a Hungarian aristocratic family.

== Origin ==
The first known ancestor of the family is János Nyáry in 1329 as a royal fiduciary representative. The family is in continuous line from the 15th century. The first prominent member is Gál, officer and member of the court of King Matthias, főispán of Somogy. He was rewarded for his bravery with the title of baron in 1535. Another branch was also raised to the rank of baron in 1573 then to that of count in 1632.

== Notable Members ==
- Ferenc Nyáry (1500-1551), hussar officer, he was rewarded for his bravery - against the Turks - by the title of baron in 1535 and by numerous estates and castles, including Berencs and Korlátkő. He was főispán de Hont, grand squire and grand captain of the kingdom.
- Lőrinc Nyáry (1515-1559), főispán of Hont, guardian of the crown (koronaőr).
- Count Pál Nyáry (1550-1607), general, court master of Prince Stephen II Bocskai.
- Count István Nyáry (1585-1643), Master of the Gates of the Realm, Grand Captain of Upper Hungary.
- Baroness Krisztina Nyáry (1604-1641), wife of Palatine of Hungary Miklós Esterházy and mother of Prince Paul I Esterházy.
- Count Rudolf Nyáry (1828-1900), Canon of Esztergom, writer and theologian.
- Count Ernő Nyáry (1906-1987), Carmelite friar, Archbishop of Baghdad.
- Count János Nyáry, founding president (1994) of the Hungarian Association of Historical Families (MTCSE, equivalent of ANF).
