= Michael I, 2nd Prince Esterházy of Galántha =

Hungarian nobleman

Michael I
- Prince Esterházy of Galántha
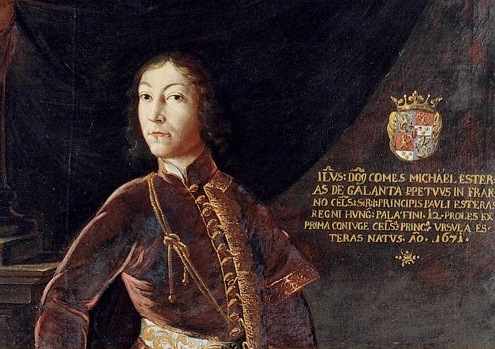

Prince Esterházy of Galántha
- Period: 26 March 1713 – 24 March 1721
- Predecessor: Paul I, Prince Esterházy
- Successor: Joseph I, 3rd Prince Esterházy of Galanthá
- Born: 4 May 1671; Frakno, Kingdom of Hungary
- Died: 24 March 1721 (aged 49); Vienna, Holy Roman Empire
- Spouse: Donna Anna Margherita Tizzone Biandrata
- Issue: Countess Amalia Eleonore Esterházy of Galántha; Countess Johanna Maria Franziska Esterházy of Galántha
Names
- German: Michael; Hungarian: Mihály
- House: Esterházy
- Father: Paul I, Prince Esterházy
- Mother: Countess Orsolya Esterházy of Galántha

Michael I, 2nd Prince Esterházy of Galántha (Hungarian: Mihály, Esterházy galánthai herceg) (4 May 1671 – 24 March 1721) was the second Prince Esterházy of Galántha. He succeeded his father, Paul I and was prince from 1713 to 1721. He was the imperial royal chamberlain and adviser for the Habsburg family.

== Early life ==
Prince Michael Esterházy was the twelfth son of Paul I, Prince Esterházy and Countess Orsolya Esterházy of Galanthá.

In 1688 in Vienna, when he was a student, he published his dissertation: Regula regum amor et timor sive Ladislaus rex Hungariae.

== Career ==
Michael was politically insignificant. He protected the family's patronage and had a hunting lodge built in Fertőd, which was expanded over 50 years later under Prince Nicholas I of Esterházy to become Esterházy Castle (Fertőd), one of the most representative castle complexes in Hungary.

== Personal life ==
On 24 May 1694 in Vienna, he married Donna Biandrata Anna Margherita (1673–1755). Together, they were the parents of two surviving daughters:

- Countess Amalia Eleonore Esterházy of Galántha (1696–1749), who married Count János Antal Pálffy ab Erdöd, son of Count János Pálffy.
- Countess Johanna Maria Franziska Esterházy of Galántha (1699–1772), who married Michael Ernst Anton von Althann.

Prince Michael died in Vienna in 1721. He is buried in the family crypt in the Franciscan monastery in Eisenstadt. As he died without a male heir, his half-brother Joseph became the next head of the family.

Michael I, 2nd Prince Esterházy of Galántha House of Esterházy Born: 4 May 1671 Died: 24 March 1721
Hungarian nobility
Preceded by Paul I	Prince Esterházy of Galántha; 26 March 1713 – 24 March 1721	Succeeded by Joseph I
