= Hrabové (Slovakia) =

Area of Bytča, Slovakia

Coordinates: 49.2067°N 18.5633°E

Hrabové is an urban area of Bytča. It lies in the north-west of Slovakia, in the Bytča District of the Žilina region.

== Geography ==
It is located south of Bytča on the left side of the Váh River in the valley of the Hrabovský stream. The cadastral territory of Hrabovský extends to the Súľovské rocks in the eastern part and to the Bytča basin in the western part.

== History ==
The first written mention of Hrabov is in a document of the Esztergom Crusader Monastery from October 6, 1268. Until 1268, the hereditary owner was Juraj (in sources as Gurgus) and his son Bedeč (Bedech). It is likely that the then king Belo IV. or his father Andrew II. donated the Hrabov to Juraj before the Mongol invasion of Hungary, which took place in 1241–1242. Already in 1261, Juraj and Bedeč gave the Hrabov to Altman as a deposit (Oltuman) for 20 hryvnias denarii. Later, when Altman married Juraj's daughter Helena, the Hrabovs permanently donated it to him in 1268. Since then, we can speak of the hereditary ownership of the Hrabovskýs.
