= Countess Éva Thököly of Késmárk =

Hungarian noblewoman (1659–1716)

Countess Éva Thököly de Késmark Princess Esterházy of Galántha
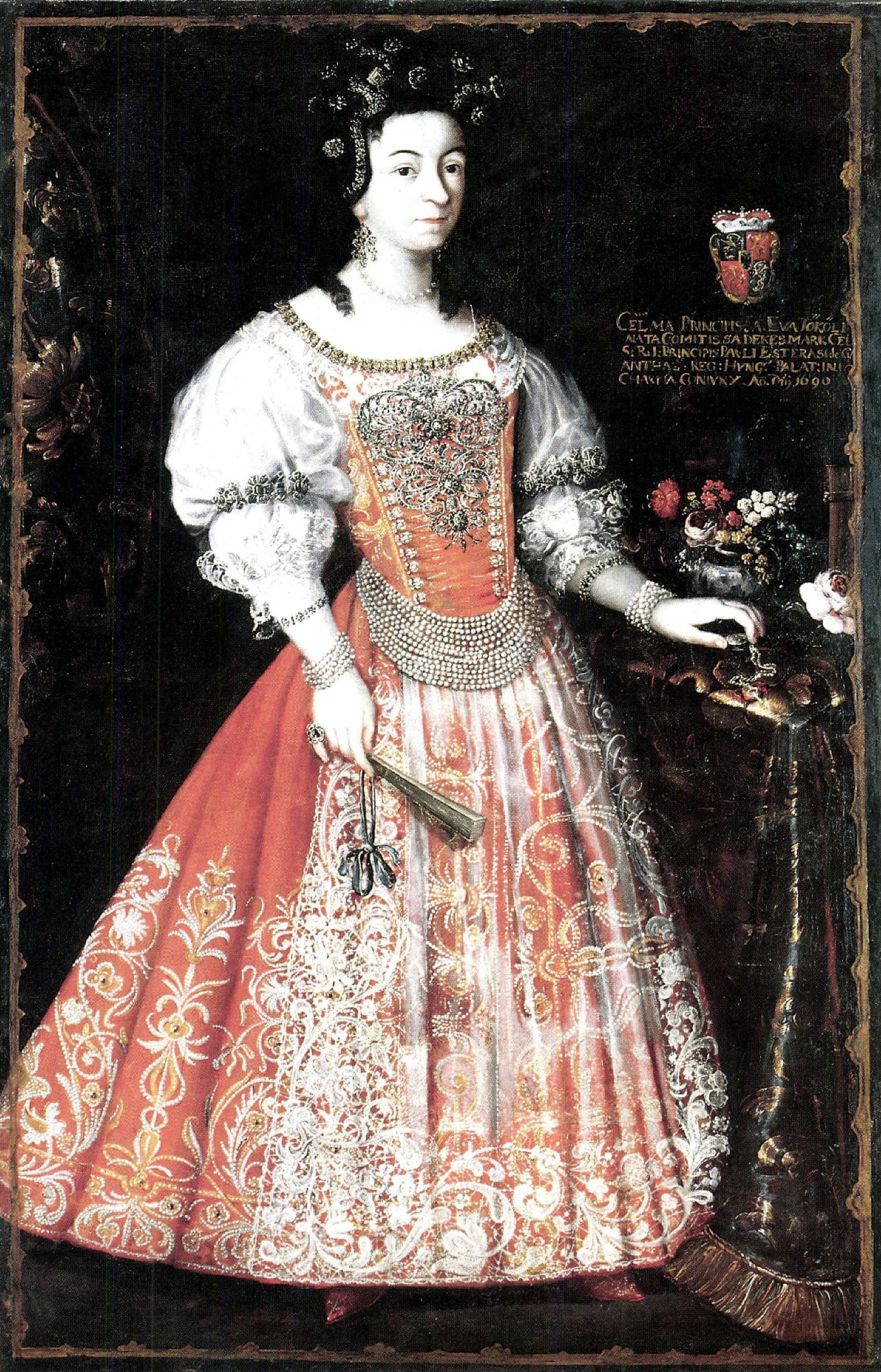
- Countess Éva Thököly, wife of Prince Paul I of Esterházy, 1690.

Princess Esterházy of Galántha
- Tenure; 8 December 1687 – 21 August 1716
- Preceded by: position established
- Succeeded by: Donna Anna Margherita Tizzone Biandrata

Personal details
- Born: Countess Éva Thököly de Késmárk; 1 February 1659 Kežmarok, Kingdom of Hungary
- Died: 21 August 1716 (aged 57) Lanzendorf, Holy Roman Empire
- Spouse: Paul I, 1st Prince Esterházy of Galántha
- Children: 7
- Parent(s): Count István Thököly; Countess Mária Gyulaffy

Countess Éva Thököly de Késmárk (1 February 1659 in Kežmarok, Kingdom of Hungary – 21 August 1716 in Lanzendorf, Holy Roman Empire), was the second wife of Paul I, Prince Esterházy (married on August 9, 1682). Éva was the youngest daughter of Count István Thököly and Mária Gyulaffy. She is the sister of Imre Thököly, Prince of Transylvania. Through her marriage, she became the first Princess Esterházy of Galantha in 1687.

== Life ==
Éva Thököly was born on February 1, 1659, in Kežmarok. She was born as the sixth child, the youngest of her two sisters. She was a half-orphan from the age of nine months, when she lost her twenty-two-year-old mother.

Her father, István Thököly, was a member of the anti-Habsburg conspiracy organized by Palatine Ferenc Wesselényi from 1664, which he supported with large sums of money. Therefore, when the conspiracy was liquidated in 1670. At the end of November, the imperial troops led by General Heister besieged him in Orava Castle. After a two-week siege, the defenders were forced to give up the castle on December 10, after the seriously ill, István Thököly died in the excitement of the siege on December 4. After the death, his son, Imré, his followers escaped from the castle and took refuge in Likava Castle in the Liptó County, together with his two sisters, Katalin and Mária. However, Éva lived through the siege of the castle by her father's side, and after the surrender of the castle, the occupying German troops imprisoned them for a while.

== Marriage ==
Éva Thököly was 23 years old on 9 August 1682 when, in Kismarton, she married Prince Pál Esterházy, who had been elected Palatine by the Sopron Parliament the previous year. The marriage could only take place with the permission of the Viennese court, as the young woman was the brother of Imre Thököly, who around this time established his Turkish vassal principality in the eastern part of the Highlands. Through this marriage, most of the Thököly estates came into the possession of the Esterházy family.

Seven children were born from the marriage, but only two of them reached adulthood:

- Count István Esterházy of Galántha (1683–1683)
- Princess Mária Terézia Anna Esterházy of Galántha (1684–1755)
- Princess Katalin Roza Esterházy of Galántha (1685–1686)
- Princess Franziska Jozefa Esterházy of Galántha (1686–1688)
- Joseph I, 3rd Prince Esterházy of Galántha (1688–1721)
- Prince Tamas Ignac Esterházy of Galántha (1689–1689)
- Prince Zsigmond Lipot Esterházy of Galántha (1692–1693)

Palatine Pál Esterházy died on March 26, 1713, in Kismarton. After that, the widowed Countess lived in complete seclusion, mostly spending time in Vienna and Kismarton. At the age of 57, she died on August 21, 1716, in Lanzendorf, a suburb of Vienna. She was buried next to her husband in the family crypt of the Franciscan monastery in Kismarton.
