= Thurzó family =

Hungarian noble family (15th-17th century)

House of Thurzó
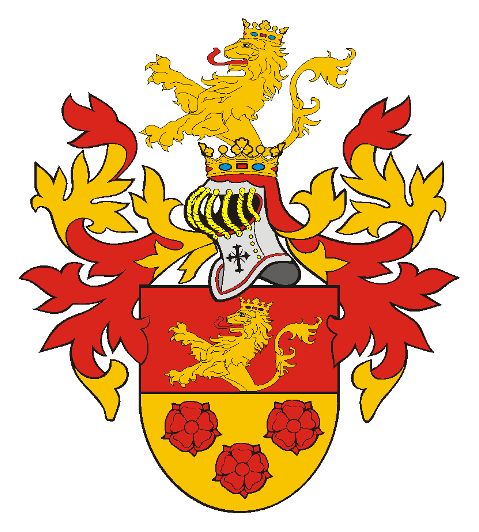
- Country: Habsburg Monarchy; Austrian Empire; Austria-Hungary; Kingdom of Hungary: Szepes County; Árva County
- Founded: 1430s
- Founder: György (I)
- Final ruler: Imre (Árva branch); Mihály (Szepes branch)
- Titles: Count Thurzó de Bethlenfalva
- Estates: Betlenfalva, Nagybiccse
- Dissolution: 1621 (Árva branch); 1636 (Szepes branch)
- Cadet branches: Árva branch Szepes branch

The House of Thurzó (Slovak: Turzo; Polish: Turzonowie) was a Hungarian noble family from the 15th century to the first half of the 17th century. It was in Kraków that the rise of the Thurzó family began, and the family in turn boosted that city into an important center of business, science, and Renaissance high culture. The family's long-term involvement in capitalist enterprises, high-level politics, the affairs of the Church, and its patronage of the arts made the family rich, famous and powerful well beyond the city. Its achievements resembled the Medici family in Italy and France, perhaps the Fugger family in Germany. Key family patriarchs were János Thurzó (1437–1508) and his sons János V (1466–1520), bishop of Wrocław, and Stanislav I (1471–1540), bishop of Olomouc, and Palatine György who founded town Turzovka.

Karen Lambrecht argues that the family's most important role was in facilitating "intercultural communications." That is they used their vast network of friends, clients and allies to introduce new concepts in the arts, facilitate the exchange of ideas among scientists, and open contacts among different high status social groups.

== Origins ==
The ancestors of the Thurzó family were perhaps Germans, coming from Lower Austria. Their original land holdings were located around the village of Betlenfalva in the Szepes county (today Betlanovce, Spiš region). From the end of the 15th century, they were mostly businessmen and entrepreneurs in Kraków, Levoča, Szepes, Gemer, central Upper Hungary, Transylvania, Bohemia and Germany.

== Business ==
In 1495, they established the Thurzo-Fugger company, which is sometimes regarded as the first capitalist company in Europe. They soon acquired a monopoly on the trade of copper and opened new places all over Europe. Around the year 1500 they dominated the production of precious and non-ferrous metals in Hungary.

From their earnings they bought lands in the northern part of the Kingdom of Hungary (today Slovakia), and owned several castles and their surroundings, for example Červený Kameň, Lietava, Tematín, Zvolen, Hlohovec, Orava and so on, as well as land in the other parts of the Kingdom of Hungary and Germany.

In the whole of the 16th and the first half of the 17th century, they were one of the most prominent families of Royal Hungary, and slowly began to control the key top posts in the kingdom. They became perpetual ispáns (hereditary heads) of the Szepes (Spiš) and Árva (today Orava) counties (in today Slovakia).

Members of the Thurzó family still exist today.

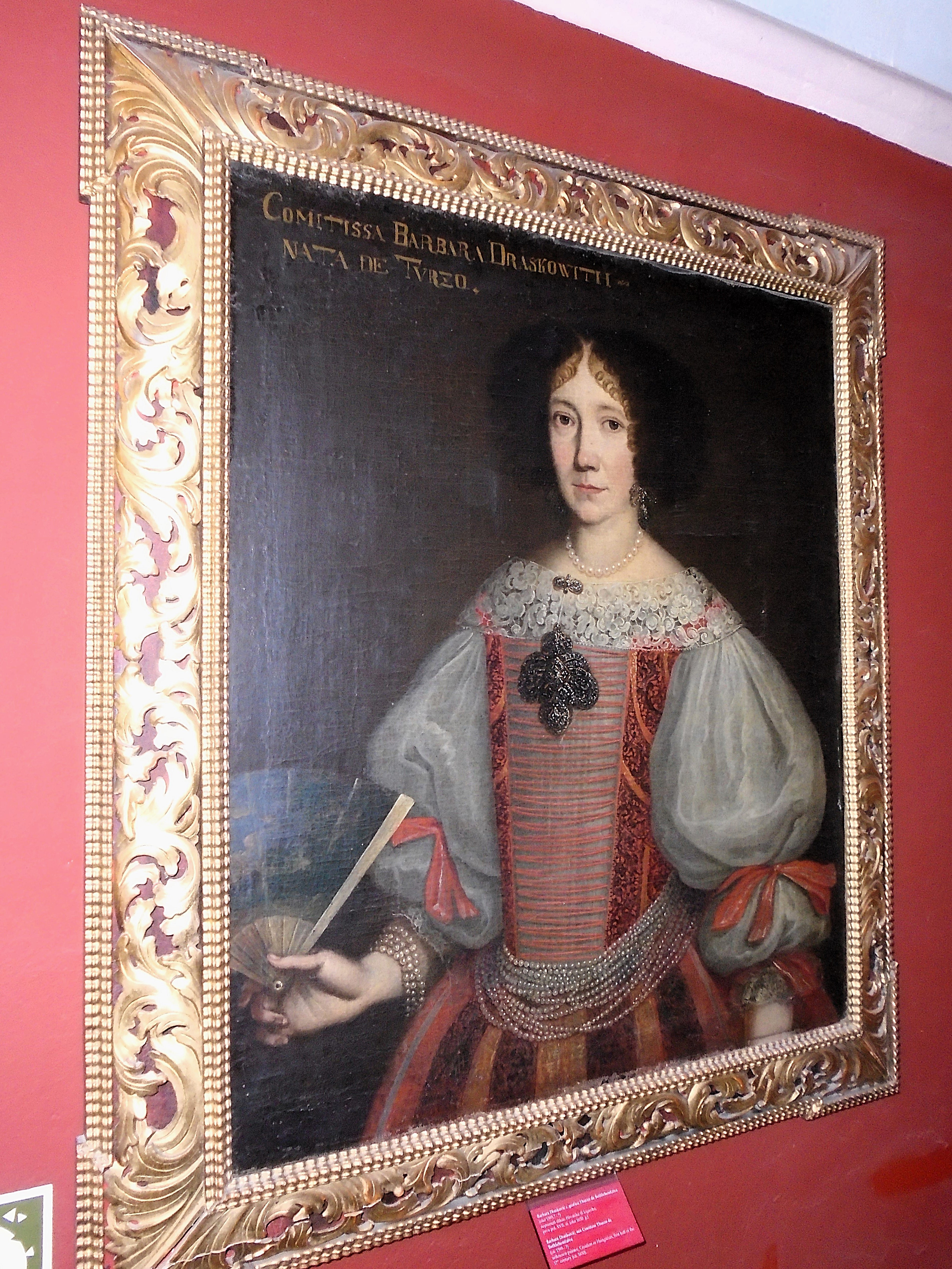
Barbara Drašković, née Thurzó, daughter of György, wife of Ivan III Drašković (Ban (Viceroy) of Croatia and Palatine of Hungary), mother of Nikola II Drašković and Ivan IV Drašković

== Notable members ==
- János Thurzó (1437–1508)
- János V Thurzó (1466–1520), bishop of Wrocław
- Stanislav I Thurzó (1471–1540), bishop of Olomouc
- György Thurzó (1567–1616), Palatine of Hungary
- Imre Thurzó (1598–1621), last male member of the family
- Erzsébet Thurzó (1621–1642)

== See also ==
- List of titled noble families in the Kingdom of Hungary
