= Ladislaus, Count Esterházy =

Hungarian noble (1626-1652)

Ladislaus Esterházy
- Count of Galánta
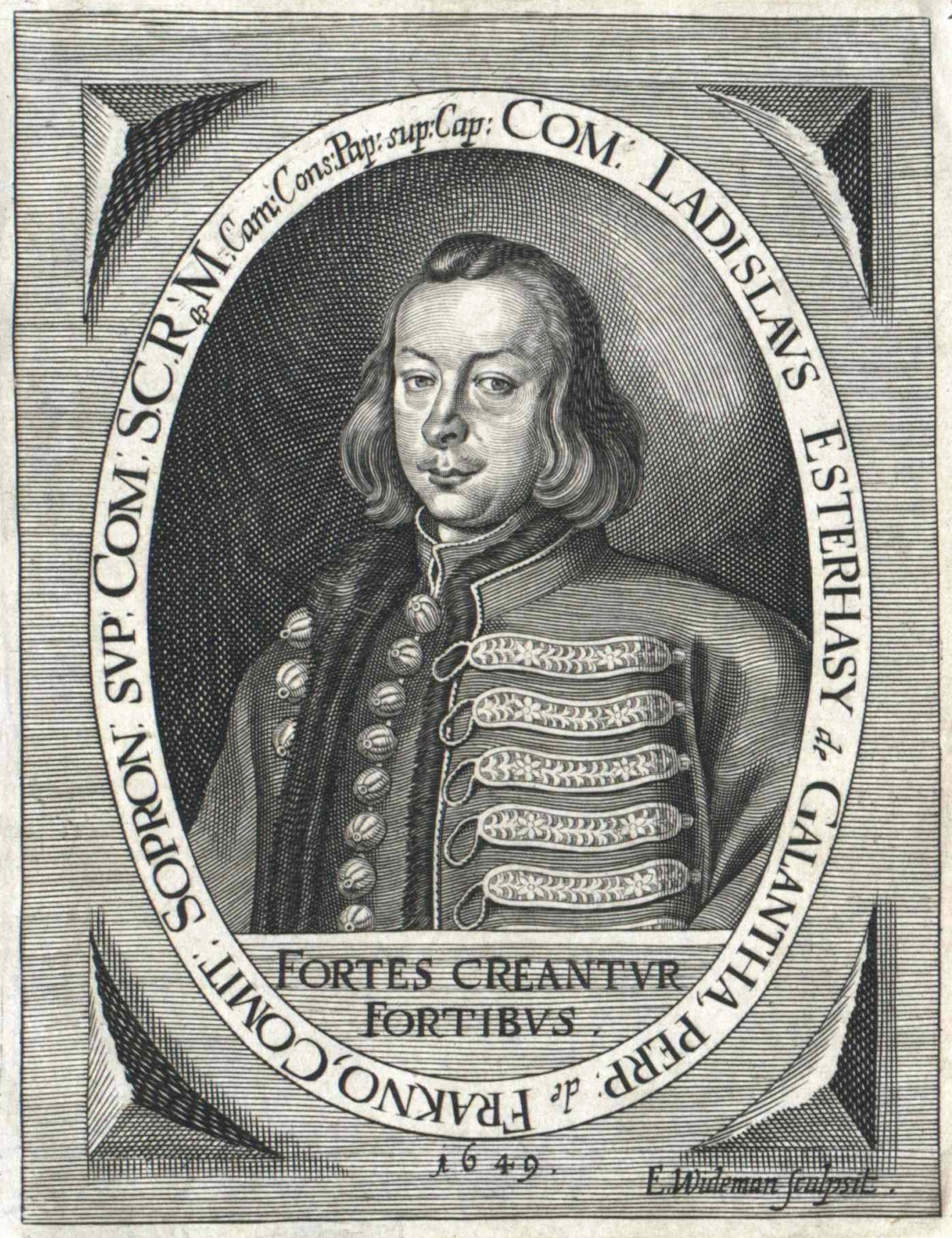
- Full name: Count László Esterházy de Galánta
- Born: 31 December 1626
- Died: 26 August 1652 (aged 25); Vezekény, Kingdom of Hungary (today: Veľké Vozokany, Slovakia)
- Noble family: Esterházy
- Spouse: Countess Eleonóra Batthyány de Németújvár (1650–1652)
- Issue: childless
- Father: Count Miklós Esterházy de Galánta
- Mother: Baroness Krisztina Nyáry de Bedegh
- Occupation: Soldier

Count Ladislaus Esterházy de Galánta (31 December 1626 – 26 August 1652) was a Hungarian noble, son of Nikolaus, Count Esterházy, who served as Palatine of Hungary. He was a general in the Imperial Army and fought against the Ottoman Empire.

== Life ==
His older brother, István Esterházy died in 1641, as a result Ladislaus succeeded his father as head of the Esterházy family in 1645. He married Eleonóra Batthyány, daughter of Imperial and Royal Chamberlain Ádám Batthyány, in 1650. However, the marriage remained childless, as Ladislaus was killed in the Battle of Vezekény, along with three other members of the family.

He was succeeded by his younger brother Paul as Count Esterházy of Galánta and inherited the family's vast wealth and landholdings at the age of 17. Paul later became the 1st Prince of Galánta.

=== Legacy ===
Coats of arms of House of Esterházy

The four Esterházy brothers were buried on 26 November 1652 in the crypt of Nagyszombat's University Church (today: Trnava, Slovakia). The battlefield was marked by a 5-metre-tall (16 ft) obelisk commemorating the victory and the sacrifice of the four brothers, erected in 1734. In 1896 it was replaced by the memorial which is still visible — a white travertine pedestal with a bronze sculpture of a lion crushing a Turkish battle flag. The pedestal bears a Latin inscription that reads: “Hold on, traveller, and read!“.

== Sources ==
- Martí, Tibor: Gróf Esterházy László (1626–1652). Fejezetek egy arisztokrata család történetéhez. PhD Dissertation, Pázmány Péter Catholic University (PPKE), 2013.
- Martí, Tibor: "Count László Esterházy: The Military Career of a Young West Transdanubian Aristocrat". In: Identity and Culture in Ottoman Hungary. Eds. Fodor, Pál–Ács, Pál. Berlin, 2017. pp. 123–139.

Ladislaus, Count Esterházy House of Esterházy Born: 31 December 1626 Died: 26 August 1652
Hungarian nobility
Preceded by Nikolaus	Count Esterházy of Galánta; 11 September 1645 – 26 August 1652	Succeeded by Paul
