= Lanzendorf =

- Municipality
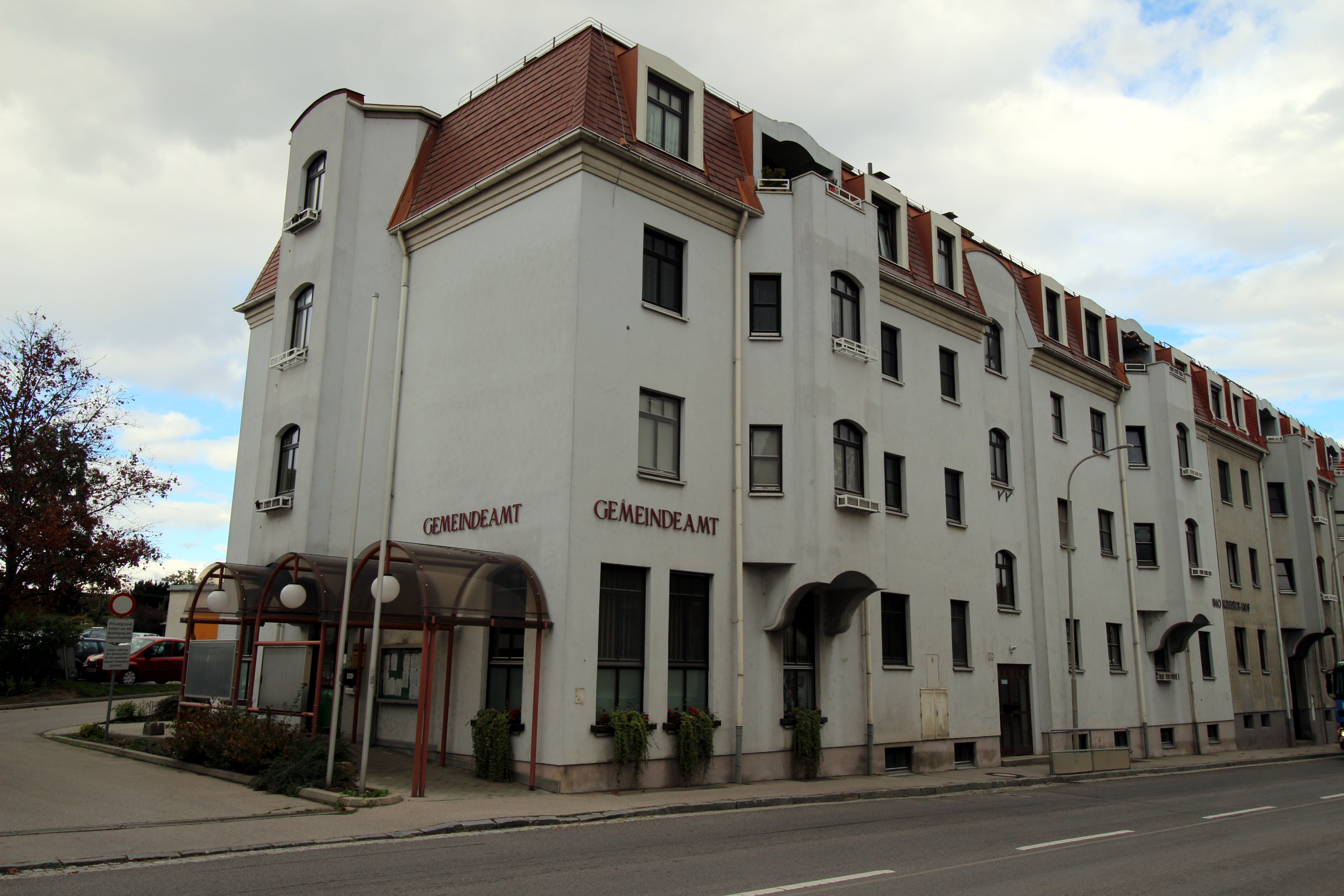
- Municipality seat

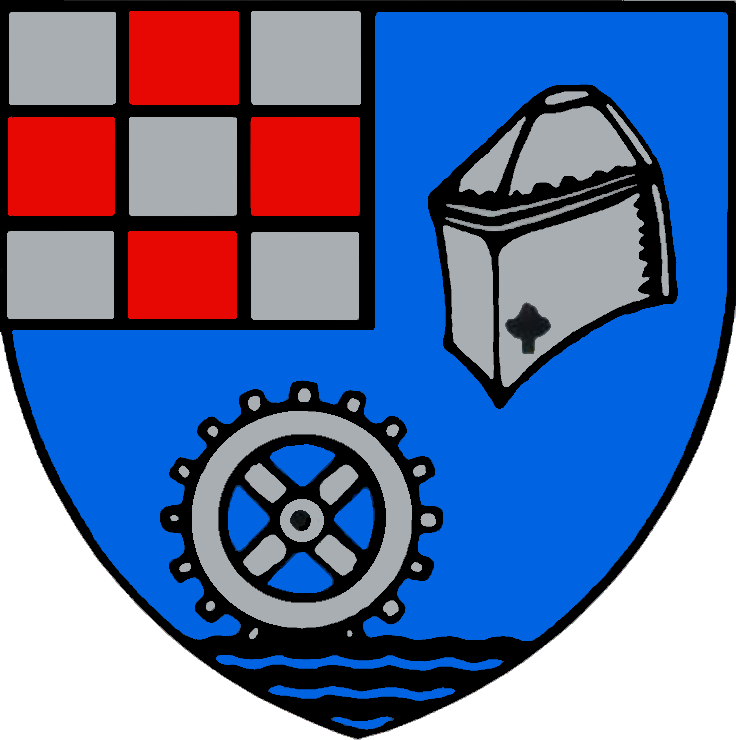
- Coat of arms

- Location within Austria
- Coordinates: 48°06′00″N 16°26′00″E
- Country: Austria
- State: Lower Austria
- District: Bruck an der Leitha

Government
  - Mayor: Emily Bauer (ÖVP)

Area
  - Total: 4.54 km^{2} (1.75 sq mi)
- Elevation: 170 m (560 ft)

Population (2018-01-01)
  - Total: 1,886
  - Density: 415/km^{2} (1,080/sq mi)
- Time zone: UTC+1 (CET)
  - Summer (DST): UTC+2 (CEST)
- Postal code: 2326
- Area code: 02235
- Vehicle registration: BL
- Website: www.lanzendorf.at

Lanzendorf is a municipality in the district of Bruck an der Leitha in the Austrian state of Lower Austria.

It belonged to Wien-Umgebung District which was dissolved in 2016.

== Population ==
Historical population
Year	Pop.	±%
1971	1,111	—
1981	1,124	+1.2%
1991	1,341	+19.3%
2001	1,464	+9.2%
2011	1,664	+13.7%
2021	1,905	+14.5%
