= Betlanovce =

Betlanovce Betlenfalva
- Municipality
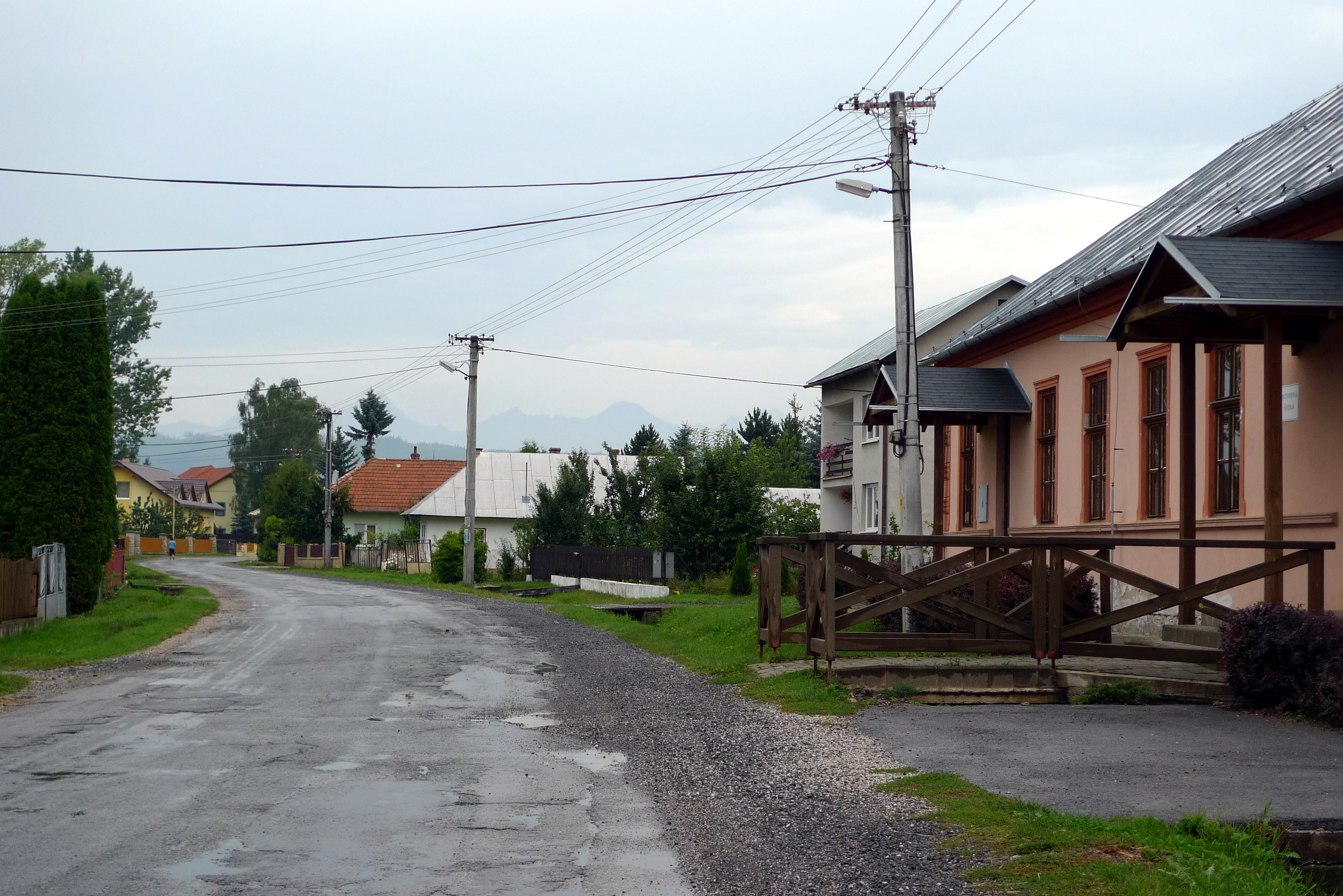
- Main road in Betlanovce

- Flag

- Location of Betlanovce in the Košice Region Location of Betlanovce in Slovakia
- Coordinates: 48.97°N 20.38°E
- Country: Slovakia
- Region: Košice Region
- District: Spišská Nová Ves District
- First mentioned: 1311

Area
  - Total: 10.12 km^{2} (3.91 sq mi)
- Elevation: 547 m (1,795 ft)

Population (2025)
  - Total: 774
- Time zone: UTC+1 (CET)
  - Summer (DST): UTC+2 (CEST)
- Postal code: 531 5
- Area code: +421 53
- Vehicle registration plate (until 2022): SN
- Website: www.betlanovce.sk

Betlanovce (Hungarian: Betlenfalva) is a village and municipality in the Spišská Nová Ves District in the Košice Region of central-eastern Slovakia.

== History ==
The name "Terra Bethlem", the earth of Bethlem, was mentioned as early as 1260 in a written document. In historical records the village itself was first mentioned in 1311 as "villa Bethlem", meaning a village belonging to Bethlem.

The village was once part of the County of the Ten Lance-bearers (Sedes X lanceatorum), a historical autonomous administrative unit within the wider Spiš county. The County of the Ten Lance-bearers existed between the 12th century and 1802, when it merged with the Spiš county proper. Between 1725 and 1803 this institution resided in Betlanovce.

== Geography ==
The municipality lies at an altitude of 547 metres (1,795 ft) and covers an area of 10.12 km^{2} (3.91 sq mi) (2025).

== Population ==
Population statistic (10 years)
Year	1995	2005	2015	2025
Count	518	660	690	774
Difference		+27.41%	+4.54%	+12.17%

Population statistic
Year	2024	2025
Count	776	774
Difference		−0.25%

It has a population of 774 people (31 December 2025).

=== Ethnicity ===
Census 2021 (1+ %)
Ethnicity	Number	Fraction
Slovak	618	83.06%
Romani	248	33.33%
Not found out	70	9.4%
Total	744	

In year 2021 was 744 people by ethnicity 618 as Slovak, 248 as Romani, 70 as Not found out, 2 as Rusyn, 2 as Russian, 1 as Moravian, 1 as Hungarian and 1 as Other.

Note on population: The difference values of population numbers in the table "Population statistic" and in the sections "Ethnicity" & "Religion" is caused by the use of various statistical methods.

=== Religion ===
Census 2021 (1+ %)
Religion	Number	Fraction
Roman Catholic Church	579	77.82%
None	60	8.06%
Christian Congregations in Slovakia	37	4.97%
Not found out	25	3.36%
Evangelical Church	19	2.55%
Other and not ascertained christian church	10	1.34%
Total	744	

In year 2021 was 744 people by religion 579 from Roman Catholic Church, 60 from None, 37 from Christian Congregations in Slovakia, 25 from Not found out, 19 from Evangelical Church, 10 from Other and not ascertained christian church, 6 from Eastern Orthodox Church, 3 from Jehovah's Witnesses, 3 from Greek Catholic Church, 1 from Calvinist Church and 1 from Paganism and natural spirituality.

== Cultural monuments ==
- Renaissance manor house of the Thurzó family

== Genealogical resources ==
The records for genealogical research are available at the state archive "Statny Archiv in Levoca, Slovakia"

- Roman Catholic church records (births/marriages/deaths): 1703-1903 (parish B)
- Lutheran church records (births/marriages/deaths): 1710-1895 (parish B)

== See also ==
- List of municipalities and towns in Slovakia
