= Granč-Petrovce =

Village and municipality in Levoča District in Slovakia

- Municipality
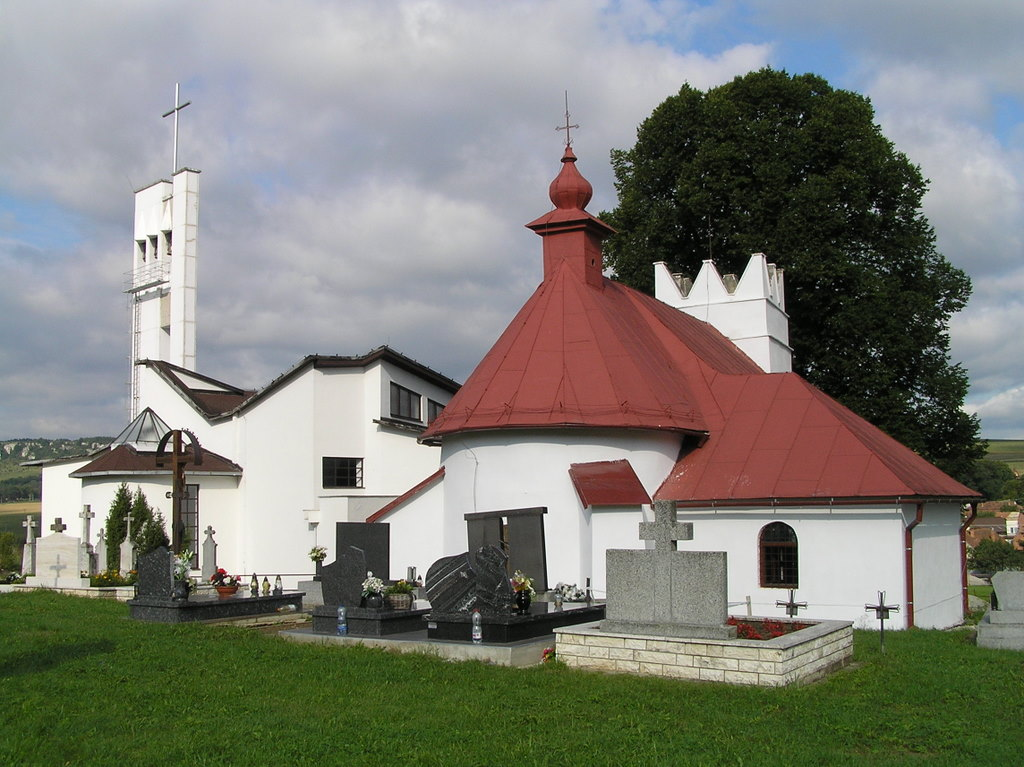

- Flag

- Location of Granč-Petrovce in the Prešov Region Location of Granč-Petrovce in Slovakia
- Coordinates: 49.00°N 20.82°E
- Country: Slovakia
- Region: Prešov Region
- District: Levoča District
- First mentioned: 1292

Area
  - Total: 3.16 km^{2} (1.22 sq mi)
- Elevation: 458 m (1,503 ft)

Population (2025)
  - Total: 688
- Time zone: UTC+1 (CET)
  - Summer (DST): UTC+2 (CEST)
- Postal code: 530 5
- Area code: +421 53
- Vehicle registration plate (until 2022): LE
- Website: www.grancpetrovce.sk

Granč-Petrovce (Hungarian: Garancspetróc) is a village and municipality in Levoča District in the Prešov Region of central-eastern Slovakia.

== History ==
In historical records the village was first mentioned in 1292.

== Geography ==
The municipality lies at an altitude of 458 metres (1,503 ft) and covers an area of 3.16 km^{2} (1.22 sq mi) (2025).

== Population ==
Population statistic (10 years)
Year	1995	2005	2015	2025
Count	590	593	602	688
Difference		+0.50%	+1.51%	+14.28%

Population statistic
Year	2024	2025
Count	663	688
Difference		+3.77%

It has a population of 688 people (31 December 2025).

=== Ethnicity ===
Census 2021 (1+ %)
Ethnicity	Number	Fraction
Slovak	623	98.42%
Not found out	11	1.73%
Total	633	

In year 2021 was 633 people by ethnicity 623 as Slovak, 11 as Not found out, 1 as Czech and 1 as French.

Note on population: The difference values of population numbers in the table "Population statistic" and in the sections "Ethnicity" & "Religion" is caused by the use of various statistical methods.

=== Religion ===
Census 2021 (1+ %)
Religion	Number	Fraction
Roman Catholic Church	587	92.73%
None	21	3.32%
Not found out	12	1.9%
Total	633	

In year 2021 was 633 people by religion 587 from Roman Catholic Church, 21 from None, 12 from Not found out, 4 from Greek Catholic Church, 4 from Evangelical Church, 2 from Christian Congregations in Slovakia, 1 from Eastern Orthodox Church, 1 from Paganism and natural spirituality and 1 from Ad hoc movements.

== Genealogical resources ==
The records for genealogical research are available at the state archive "Statny Archiv in Levoca, Slovakia"

- Roman Catholic church records (births/marriages/deaths): 1646-1948 (parish B)

== See also ==
- List of municipalities and towns in Slovakia
