= Gábor Esterházy (1673–1704) =

- Count of Galántha
- Full name: Count Gábor Esterházy de Galántha
- Born: April 15, 1673
- Died: December 13, 1704 (aged 31)
- Noble family: House of Esterházy
- Spouse: Margaretha Christina von Abensberg und Traun (1694–1704)
- Father: Paul I, Prince Esterházy of Galántha
- Mother: Countess Orsolya Esterházy de Galántha

Count Gábor (Gabriel) Esterházy de Galántha (15 April 1673 – 13 December 1704) was a Hungarian imperial general and noble, son of Paul I, Prince Esterházy and Orsolya Esterházy.

== Career ==
He studied in Vienna and became imperial knight in 1690. He also functioned as a royal chamberlain and councillor. Count Esterházy served as ispán of Fejér County between 1688 and 16 September 1691. After that he was appointed ispán of Somogy and Zala Counties. He resigned from his preceding position on 29 March 1713. He became imperial general in 1701 and functioned as the commander of the Hungarian cavalry regiment. He died of smallpox in 1704.

== Family ==
Family Tree of the Princes Esterházy of Galántha

Count Gábor Esterházy married Countess Margaretha Christina von Abensberg und Traun (1677–1725) on 24 May 1694 in Vienna. They had six children:

- József (6 April 1695 – 1697), died young
- Mária Anna (b. 1698), died young
- Mihály (1701 – 4 January 1702), died young
- Mária Józsefa (b. 1701), died young
- Margit (d. 1732)
- Mária Franziska (29 November 1702 – 31 January 1778), married Altgrave Karl Anton zu Salm-Reifferscheidt-Bedburg und Alfter (1697–1755)

== Works ==
- Hungaria Triumphans sive S. Ladislaus Rex Hungariae… in Basilica D. Stephani Nomine Inclytae Nation. Hung. panegyris laudat. Viennae, 1689. 27. Junii.

== Sources ==
- (in Hungarian and German) Fallenbüchl, Zoltán (1994). Magyarország főispánjai, 1526–1848 ("Lord-Lieutenants of Counties in Hungary, 1526–1848"). Argumentum Kiadó. ISBN 963-7719-81-4.
- (in Hungarian) Szinnyei, József: Magyar írók élete és munkái II. (Caban–Exner). Budapest, Hornyánszky, 1893. (Online)
