= György Thurzó =

Palatine of Hungary

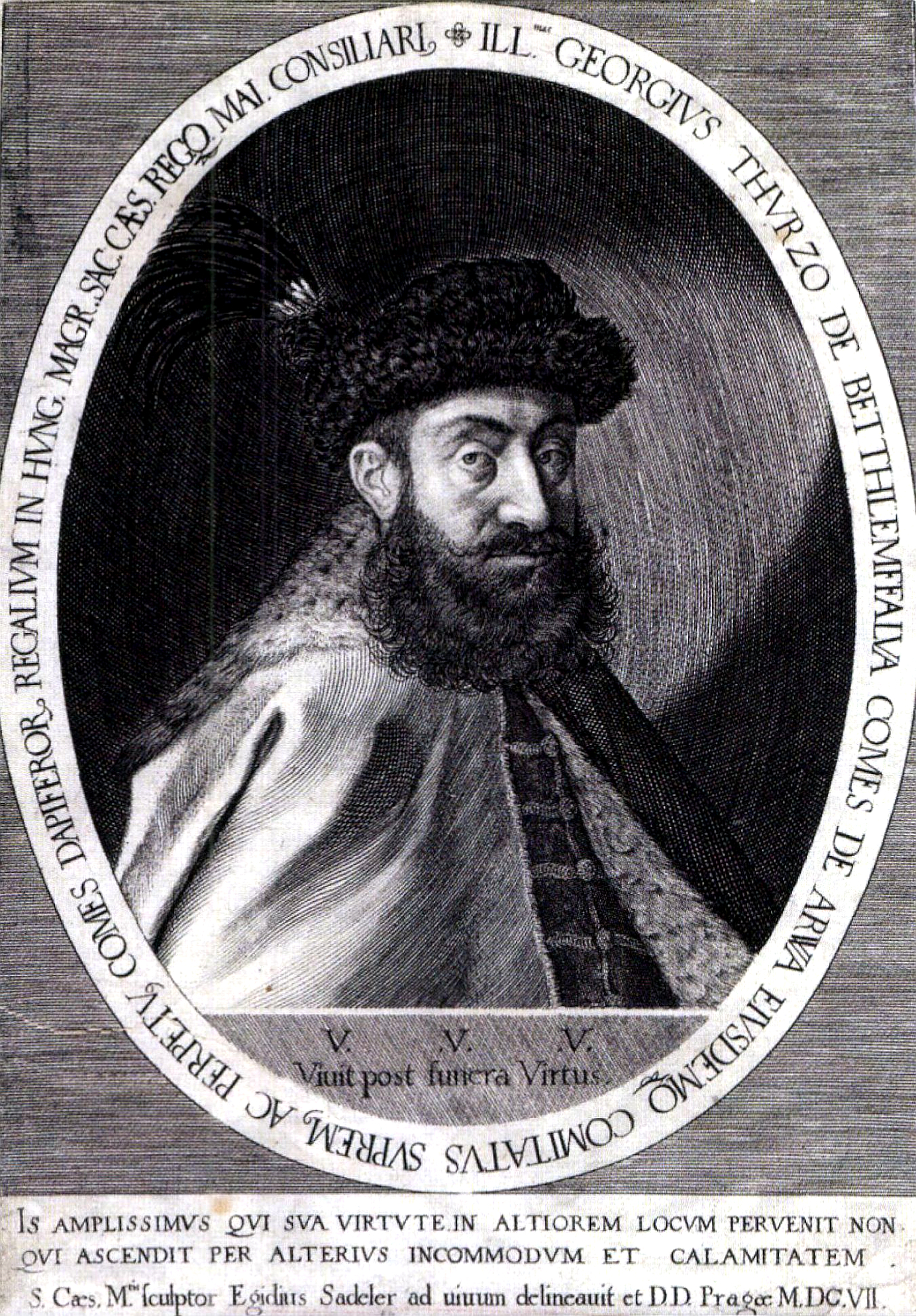
Palatine György Thurzó

György Thurzó (German: Georg Thurzo, Slovak: Juraj Turzo; 2 September 1567 – 24 December 1616) was a prominent Hungarian nobleman and Palatine of Hungary between 1609 and 1616, a position equivalent to a prime minister or viceroy, serving under the rule of the Habsburgs in the early 17th century. He is historically significant for his connection to Elizabeth Báthory, one of the most infamous figures in Hungarian and Slovak history.

== Biography ==
György Thurzó was born into the richest noble house in Upper Hungary, the Thurzó family from Szepes County. When György was 9 years old, his father, Ferenc, died and he was raised by his mother Katarina Zrinski (Kata Zrínyi), who was the daughter of Croatian Ban Nikola IV Zrinski (Miklós Zrínyi).

In 1575, Katarina and her children moved to the Nagybiccse (now Bytča, Slovakia) estate. György's mother remarried to Imre Forgách who rather liked György and ensured him a very high standard of education with the highly regarded scientist from Saxony, Christoph Echardus.

At the age of 17, György decided to take up a military and political career which he was able to put into action against the invading Ottomans in many battles. In 1590, at the Battle of Esztergom, he won a great victory over the Ottomans and then in the same year, at the Battle of Székesfehervár. György was a very educated man; he spoke Hungarian, German, Latin, Greek, Croatian and Slovak fluently, was very interested in the arts and the sciences, and he was excited by new ideas.

He grew up on the Royal court of then Archduke Matthias, brother of Rudolf II, Holy Roman Emperor, whom he succeeded. On 26 April 1585 György's mother died and he was forced to return to Nagybiccse to take care of his estates of Árva (now Orava, Slovakia), Zsolnalitva (now Lietava, Slovakia) and Nagybiccse.

In the same year, he married Zsófia Forgách and they had two daughters together, but Zsófia died giving birth to the second daughter in 1590. Several years later, György married Erzsébet Czobor, with whom he had six unnamed daughters and a son, Imre Thurzó.

He was also a devout Lutheran. He built Lutheran churches in his lands. He paid for the construction of Lutheran guilds in his estates. In 1610, he issued a decree: Cuius regio, eius religio. In 1609, he was bestowed with the title of, "Palatine of Hungary". Until his death, he remained loyal to the Habsburg emperor. He died in 1616, in his estate in Nagybiccse.

== Elizabeth Báthory arrest ==
György Thurzó is notably remembered for his pivotal role in the apprehension and confinement of the Hungarian Countess Elizabeth Báthory, a process that notably lacked a formal trial. Thurzó's engagement in the Báthory case originated from serious accusations against her. Elizabeth Báthory, hailing from an influential Hungarian noble family, faced allegations of torturing and murdering numerous young women. The total number of her alleged victims is a matter of debate, but she is frequently referred to as one of history's most prolific female serial killers.

Amidst swirling rumors and reports, Emperor Matthias, purportedly alarmed by these disturbing claims, assigned Thurzó the task of probing into Báthory's activities. Thurzó, vested with substantial judicial and administrative authority, spearheaded this investigation, which included extensive testimonies from witnesses and survivors.

In December 1610, Thurzó apprehended Báthory and four of her supposed co-conspirators. Báthory was subsequently detained in her Csejte Castle, Hungary situated in modern-day Slovakia. Notably, while her accomplices faced trial and execution, Báthory herself was never formally tried. She was instead subjected to house arrest, a decision potentially swayed by her aristocratic status and the possible political repercussions of a public trial.

Amidst these historical accounts, an alternative theory suggests that Thurzó might have framed Báthory. This theory posits that Thurzó, perhaps motivated by political or financial interests, manipulated evidence or testimonies against Báthory. Torture was notably used to obtain confessions and statements. Some historians speculate that her immense wealth and lands were appealing to her contemporaries, including Thurzó, who might have seen an opportunity in her downfall. This viewpoint adds another layer of intrigue to the case, underscoring the possibility of a conspiracy against Báthory.

Thurzó's involvement in the Báthory affair, whether as a lawful investigator or as part of a larger scheme, signifies the intricate interplay of justice, politics, and personal agendas in early 17th-century Hungary. His actions in ending what was perceived as Báthory's criminal spree were crucial, yet they also illuminate the intricate dynamics of power among the Hungarian nobility, the monarchy, and the Habsburg dominion. This incident remains a significant chapter in Thurzó's career and the broader narrative of Central European history during this period.

== See also ==
- Orava Castle
