= Orsolya Dersffy =

Hungarian noble (1583–1619)

- Baroness of Szerdahely
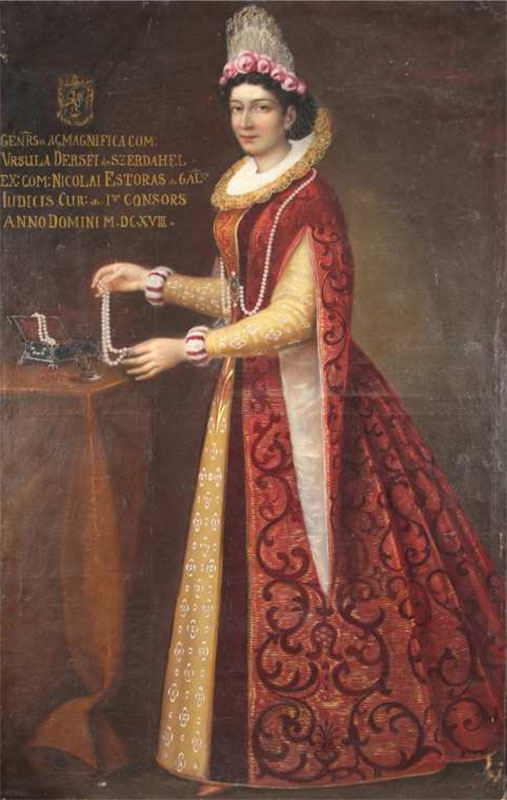
- Full name: Baroness Orsolya Dersffy de Szerdahely
- Born: 1583
- Died: 15 March 1619 (aged 35–36); Zólyom, Kingdom of Hungary (today: Zvolen, Slovakia)
- Noble family: House of Dersffy; House of Esterházy
- Spouses: Ferenc Mágóchy (until 1611); Count Miklós Esterházy de Galántha (1612–1619)
- Issue: István
- Father: Baron Ferenc Dersffy de Szerdahely
- Mother: Orsolya Császár de Lanzér

Baroness Orsolya Dersffy de Szerdahely (Dersfy; 1583 – 15 March 1619) was the first wife of the later Palatine Nikolaus, Count Esterházy.

== Family ==
She was born in 1583 as the first daughter of Baron Ferenc Dersffy, who served as Master of the Cup-bearers and Vice-ispán (Viscount; vicecomes) of Sáros County, and his second wife Orsolya Császár de Lanzér. She had a younger sister, Mária who married to Count Esterházy's brother Baron Gábor Esterházy in 1619.

Baroness Orsolya married at first to Ferenc Mágóchy who functioned as Captain General of Kassa (today: Košice, Slovakia). She already had a love affair with Esterházy, who served under Mágóchy, during her first marriage. Her husband died in 1611 and the couple were married one year later, on 22 November 1612 at Munkács (today: Mukachevo, Ukraine). The marriage made Esterházy (later Count) immensely rich and brought him also the lordships of Munkács. Their only son was born in 1616:

- István (1616–1641), heir to the Esterházy property, but died predeceasing his father and leaving his younger brother, László, as heir apparent
- Krisztina (d. 1617), died as an infant

Orsolya Dersffy died in 1619. Her husband married to Baroness Krisztina Nyáry de Bedegh on 21 July 1624, whom his other children were born.
