= Nikolaus, Count Esterházy =

17th-century Hungarian nobleman

Nikolaus Esterházy
- Count of Galántha
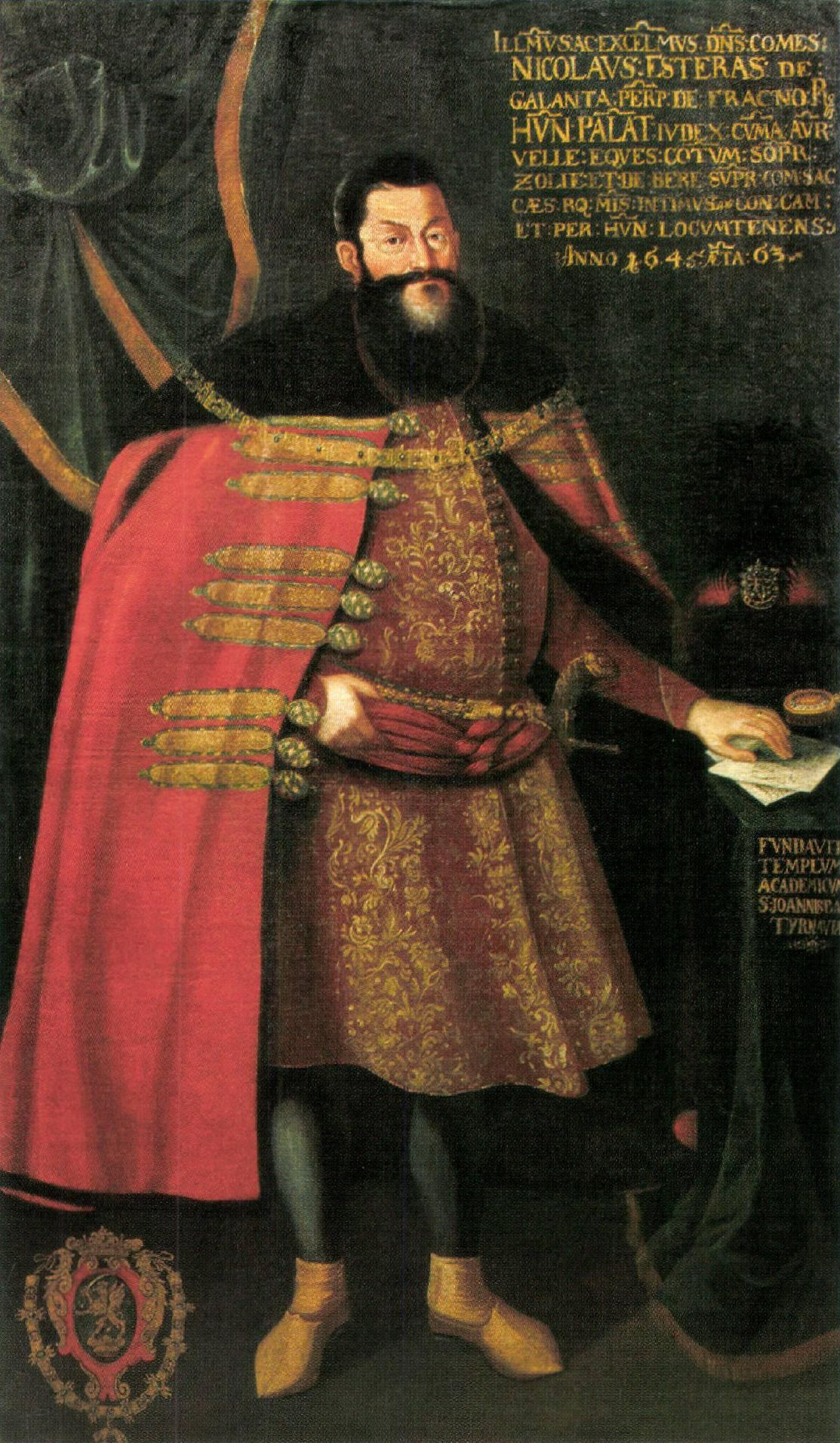

Palatine of Hungary
- Reign: 25 October 1625 – 11 September 1645
- Predecessor: Szaniszló Thurzó
- Successor: János Draskovich
- Full name: Count Miklós Esterházy de Galántha
- Born: 8 April 1583; Galánta, Kingdom of Hungary (today: Galanta, Slovakia)
- Died: 11 September 1645 (aged 62); Nagyhöflány, Kingdom of Hungary (today: Großhöflein, Austria)
- Noble family: House of Esterházy
- Spouses: Baroness Orsolya Dersffy de Szerdahely (1612–1619); Baroness Krisztina Nyáry de Bedegh (1624–1641)
- Issue: eleven children, including: Stephen; Ladislaus; Paul; Anna Julia
- Father: Ferenc Esterházy de Galántha
- Mother: Zsófia Illésházy de Illésháza

Baron, later Count Nikolaus Esterházy de Galántha (English: Nicholas Esterházy of Galántha) (Galanta, 8 April 1583 – Großhöflein, 11 September 1645) was the founder of the West-Hungarian noble House of Esterházy which became one of the grandest and most influential aristocratic families of the Kingdom of Hungary.

== Life ==
Nikolaus's parents were Protestants, and he himself followed them at first, but he subsequently became a Catholic and, along with Cardinal Pázmány, his most serious rival at court, became a pillar of Catholicism, both religiously and politically. At court, he opposed the two great Protestant champions of the period, Gabriel Bethlen and George I Rákóczi. Matthias II made him a baron (1613), count of Bereg (1617), and lord-lieutenant (Hungarian: főispán) of the county of Zólyom and magister curiae regiae (1618).

His political ideal was the consolidation of the House of Habsburg as a means towards freeing Hungary from domination by the Ottoman Empire, and the Habsburg noted him because of his zeal to that end. He himself, on one occasion (1623), defeated the Turks on the banks of the Nyitra.

His first marriage with Orsolya Dersffy made him immensely rich and brought him also the lordships of Munkács (today: Mukachevo, Ukraine) and Lánzsér-Lakompak (today: Landsee and Lackenbach in Austria). When he had to hand over Munkács in 1622 to Gabriel Bethlen because of the Peace of Nikolsburg, he was compensated by the Emperor with 2 new lordships, namely Fraknó (today: Forchtenstein, Austria) and Kismarton (today: Eisenstadt, Austria).

In 1625 he officiated in the coronation of the Emperor Ferdinand II, who made him Palatine of Hungary, the highest political function in the country. He also became Count of Fraknó and Knight in the Order of the Golden Fleece on 10 August 1626.

Nikolaus was also an accomplished writer.

== Marriage and children ==
He married in 1612 Baroness Orsolya Dersffy de Szerdahely (1583–1619) and they had:

- István (1616–1641), died before his father. Had one daughter.
- Krisztina (1617–1617).

After his first wife's death, he married in 1624 Baroness Krisztina Nyáry de Bedegh (1604–1641) and had:

- Magdolna (1625–1627)
- László (1626–1652), killed in at the Battle of Vezekény
- Katalin, (1628–1630)
- Anna Júlia (1630–1669), married Franz III. Nádasdy
- Michael (1632–1633)
- Mária Krisztina (1634–1634)
- Paul I Esterházy of Galántha (1635–1713), his successor
- Mária (1638–1684), married Count György Drugeth de Homonna
- Ferenc (1641–1683), had issue. Ancestor of Móric Esterházy, Márton Esterházy, and Péter Esterházy.

== Gallery ==
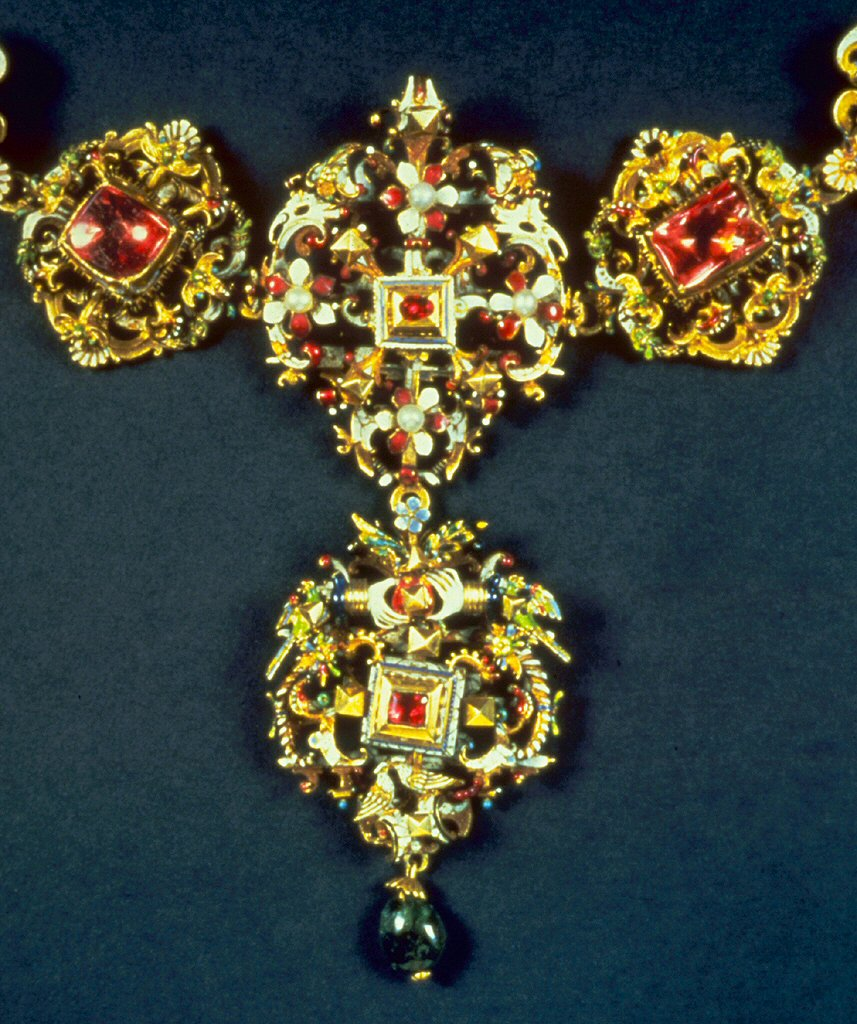
The jewelled wedding collar reputedly worn by Esterházy at his wedding in 1611.

== Notes ==
Nikolaus, Count Esterházy House of Esterházy Born: 8 April 1583 Died: 11 September 1645
Political offices
Preceded by Péter Révay	Master of the household 2 September 1618 – 4 August 1622	Succeeded by Imre Czobor
Preceded by György Drugeth	Judge royal 4 August 1622 – 25 October 1625	Succeeded by Menyhért Alaghy
Preceded by Szaniszló Thurzó	Palatine of Hungary; 25 October 1625 – 11 September 1645	Succeeded by János Draskovich
Hungarian nobility
Preceded by himself as Baron	Count Esterházy of Galántha; 10 August 1626 – 11 September 1645	Succeeded by Ladislaus
