= Paul I, Prince Esterházy =

Paul I
- 1st Prince Esterházy of Galántha; Palatine of Hungary
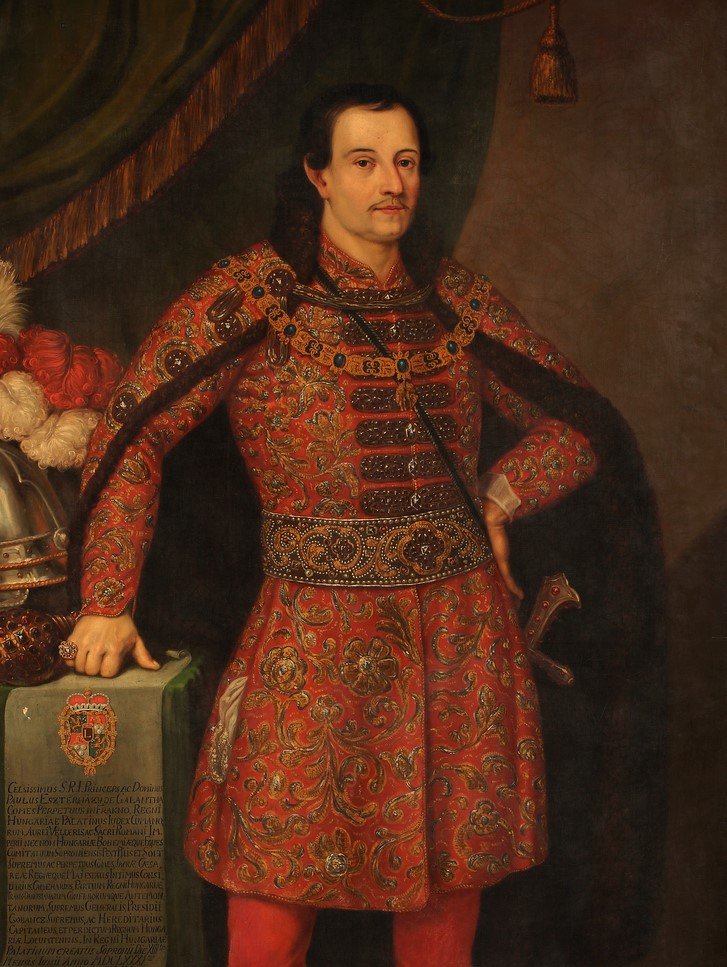

Palatine of Hungary
- Reign: 13 June 1681 – 26 March 1713
- Predecessor: none
- Successor: Miklós Pálffy

Count Esterházy of Galántha
- Period: 16 August 1652 – 8 December 1687
- Predecessor: Ladislaus
- Successor: himself as Prince

Prince Esterházy of Galántha
- Period: 8 December 1687 – 26 March 1713
- Predecessor: himself as Count
- Successor: Michael I
- Born: 7 September 1635; Kismarton, Eisenstadt, Kingdom of Hungary
- Died: 26 March 1713 (aged 77); Kismarton, Eisenstadt, Kingdom of Hungary
- Burial: Franziskanerkirche, Kismarton (Eisenstadt)
- Spouse: Countess Orsolya Esterházy of Galántha; Countess Éva Thököly of Késmárk
- Issue: See below for issue
Names
- German: Paul; Hungarian: Pál
- House: Esterházy
- Father: Nicholas, Count Esterházy of Galántha
- Mother: Baroness Krisztina Nyáry of Bedegh
- Religion: Roman Catholic

Paul I, 1st Prince Esterházy of Galántha (German: Paul Fürst Esterházy von Galantha), (Hungarian: Pál, Esterházy galánthai herceg) (8 September 1635 – 26 March 1713) was the first Prince Esterházy of Galántha from 1687 to 1713, Palatine of the Kingdom of Hungary from 1681 to 1713, and an Imperial Field Marshal. Paul was also an accomplished poet, harpsichordist, and composer. He actively participated in various battles against the Ottoman Turks during the Fourth Austro-Turkish War (1663–1664) and the Great Turkish War (1683–1699). Paul is credited with establishing the wealth, power, and influence of the Princely House of Esterházy.

== Family and early life ==
Born in Kismarton (now Eisenstadt, Austria), Kingdom of Hungary, Paul was the third son of Nicholas, Count Esterházy of Galántha and his second wife Baroness Krisztina Nyáry of Bedegh. His father, Nicholas, bore the office of the Palatine of the Kingdom of Hungary.

Paul was raised in a deeply religious atmosphere and studied at Jesuit institutions in Graz and Nagyszombat (today Trnava, Slovakia). He displayed literary talents at an early age.

On 16 August 1652, Paul's elder brother Ladislaus was killed in the Battle of Vezekény (Vezekey) against the Turks. Paul succeeded Ladislaus as Count Esterházy of Galántha and inherited the family's vast wealth and landholdings at the age of 17.

== Military career ==
Paul began his military career as early as 1663, and opposed the Turks in the battles of Austro-Turkish War (1663–1664) (e.g. siege of Novi Zrin in June 1664 and Battle of Saint Gotthard on 1 August 1664) under the leadership of Raimondo Montecuccoli. Paul served with distinction under Montecuccoli alongside Miklós Zrínyi. Paul served in the army with such distinction that he was appointed to the position of Field Marshal and Commander-in-chief of the Military Frontier of southern Kingdom of Hungary beginning in 1667 at the age of 30. While serving as a commander-in-chief, Paul defeated malcontents at Leutschau and Győr. Paul's troops were among the coalition that was raised for the Battle of Vienna in 1683. After the deliverance of Vienna from the Turks, Paul entered Buda in 1686 at the head of 20,000 men. Throughout his military career, Paul led the Hungarian side of the Habsburg army into battle against the Ottoman Turks a total of 16 times.

Paul throughout his life remained loyal to the Habsburgs, and therefore was not involved in the conspiracy of the Hungarian nobility in the 1670s. This loyalty was rewarded by the Habsburgs in 1681, when Paul was appointed to the position of Palatine of the Kingdom of Hungary. The wars with the Turks did not go unnoticed by the Esterházy family, because the advance of the Turks to Vienna devastated many of the family's lands and brought slaughter to many of the lands' residents.

In 1681, Paul was made a Knight of the Austrian Order of the Golden Fleece. On 8 December 1687, Leopold I, Holy Roman Emperor issued a princely diploma elevating Paul to a Prince of the Holy Roman Empire for his military successes against the Turks during the reconquest of Hungary and his loyalty to the House of Habsburg. The title of Prince was extended to his male descendants in 1712. On 9 December 1687, in his role as Palatine, Paul placed the Crown of Saint Stephen on the head of Archduke Joseph of Austria (later Joseph I, Holy Roman Emperor) as the first Habsburg hereditary king of Hungary. As an ally of the Habsburgs, Paul had as one of his principal concerns the recatholicization of those areas of Central Europe "infected" by Protestantism. Paul's loyalty was also demonstrated in his cooperation with the Habsburg court in the subversion of civil and religious liberties.

In 1703, Paul again fought with the Habsburgs in the wars with the Kuruc, armed anti-Habsburg Hungarian rebels in Royal Hungary.

From 1711 until his death, Paul served as Lord Lieutenant of Moson County.

== Building efforts ==
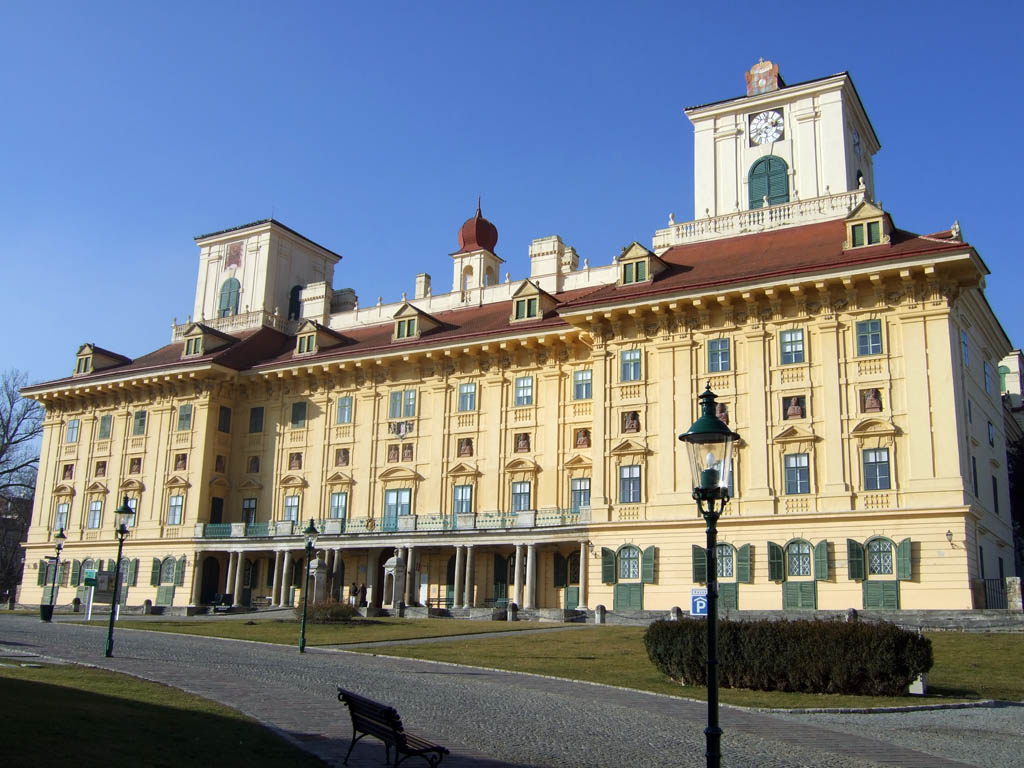
Schloss Esterházy

Paul converted Schloss Esterházy in Eisenstadt from a medieval castle into a Baroque palace. Paul began his renovations of Schloss Esterházy in 1663. The additions made by Paul took nearly ten years to complete and gave the palace the façade it has retained to the present.

Paul further extended, ornamented, and fortified Forchtenstein Castle with architect Domenico Carlone. At Forchtenstein Castle, Paul founded the Esterházy family's treasure house and created an extensive portrait gallery of Esterházy family ancestors.

== Musical career ==
Paul was an accomplished musical amateur, composer, and patron of the arts. He composed numerous cantatas, the most notable of which are Harmonia Caelestis. Harmonia Caelestis is a cycle of 55 sacred cantatas composed in the Baroque style published in Vienna in 1711. Paul was one of the chief compilers of the Trophaeum Domus Inclytae Estorationae.

Paul used his great wealth in the liberal patronage of art and literature. He founded the Esterházy private chapel, famous for its solo singers, chorus, and orchestra.

== Marriage and issue ==
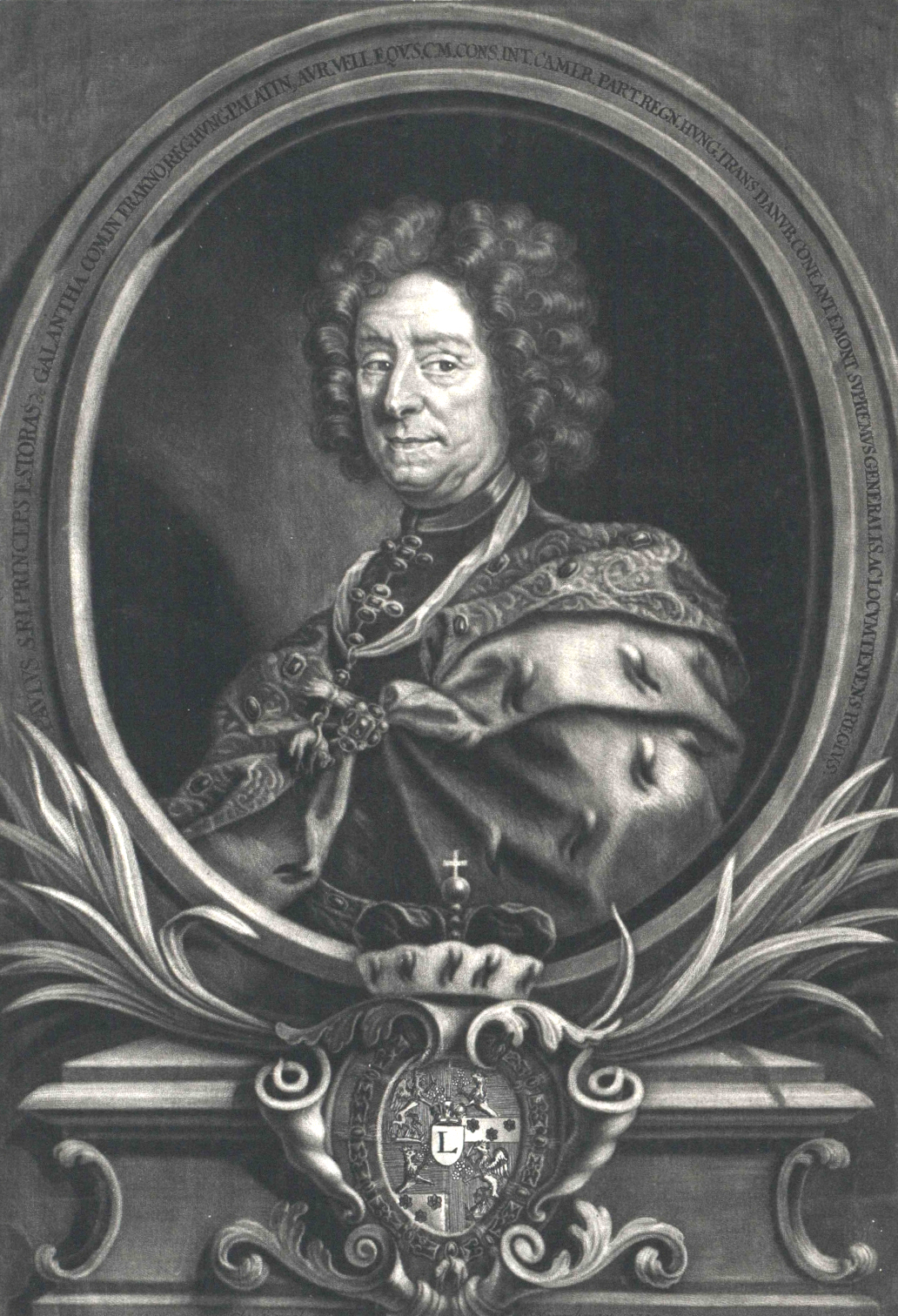
Paul shortly after his elevation to Prince Esterházy of Galántha.

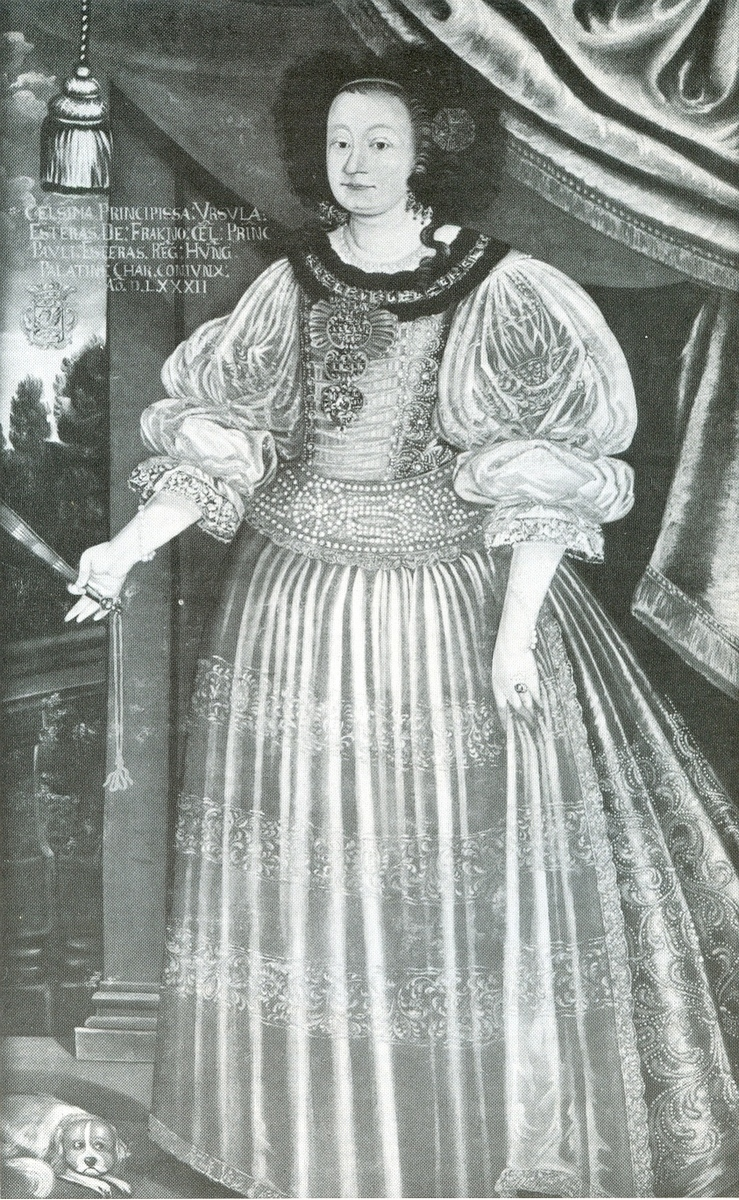
His first wife, Countess Orsolya Esterházy of Galántha.

Paul was married twice. He married first to his niece Countess Orsolya Esterházy of Galántha, daughter of his brother Count István Esterházy of Galántha and his wife Countess Erzsébet Thurzó of Bethlenfalva, on 7 February 1652 in Eisenstadt. Paul's marriage to his eldest brother's daughter was done in part to prevent the division of the Esterházy family's property Paul and Orsolya had nineteen children:

- Prince Miklós Antal Esterházy of Galántha (1655–1695)
- Count Pál Esterházy of Galántha (1657–1664)
- Countess Katalin Esterházy of Galántha (1659–1664)
- Count István József Esterházy of Galántha (1660–1669)
- Prince László Ignac Esterházy of Galántha (1662–1689)
- Princess Krisztina Esterházy of Galántha (1663–1732)
- Count Elek Domokos Esterházy of Galántha (1664–1673)
- Count Ferenc Agoston Esterházy of Galántha (1666–1673)
- Countess Ilona Esterházy of Galántha (1667–1681)
- Count János Benedek Esterházy of Galántha (1668–1683)
- Princess Orsolya Esterházy of Galántha (1670–after 1696)
- Michael I, 2nd Prince Esterházy of Galántha (1671–1721)
- Count György Bernat Esterházy of Galántha (1672–1672)
- Prince Gábor Esterházy of Galántha (1673–1704)
- Count Pál Esterházy of Galántha (1675–1683)
- Princess Anna Julia Esterházy of Galántha (1676–1700)
- Count Imre Esterházy of Galántha (1677–1677)
- Princess Anna Terézia Esterházy of Galántha (1679–after 1692)
- Prince Adam Esterházy of Galántha (1680–1720)

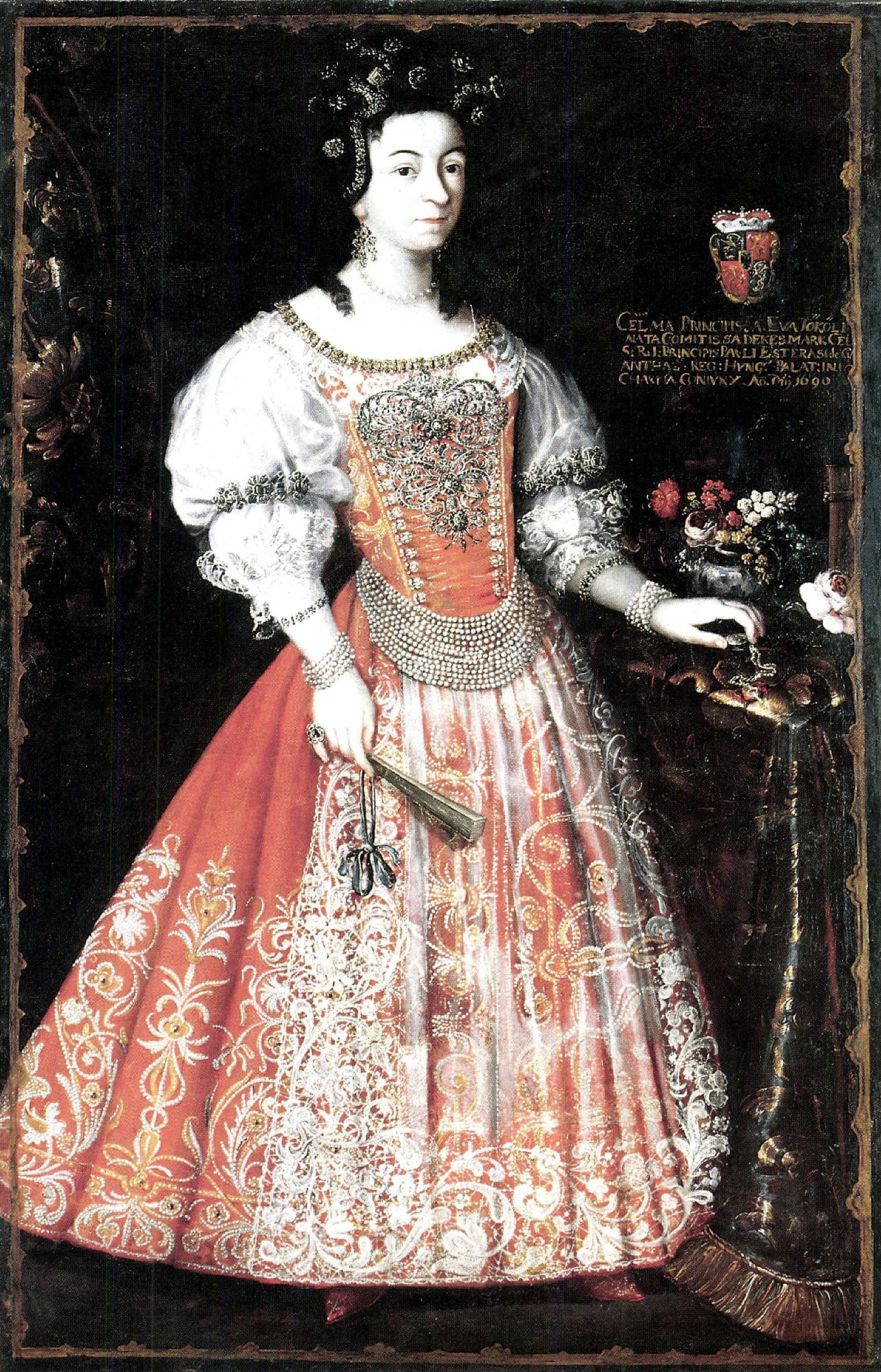
His second wife, Countess Éva Thököly.

After the death of his first wife, Paul married Countess Éva Thököly of Késmárk, daughter of István, Count Thököly of Késmárk and his wife Mária Gyulaffy of Rátót. Paul and Éva had the following children:

- Count István Esterházy of Galántha (1683–1683)
- Princess Mária Terézia Anna Esterházy of Galántha (1684–1755)
- Princess Katalin Roza Esterházy of Galántha (1685–1686)
- Princess Franziska Jozefa Esterházy of Galántha (1686–1688)
- Joseph I, 3rd Prince Esterházy of Galanthá (1688–1721)
- Prince Tamas Ignac Esterházy of Galántha (1689–1689)
- Prince Zsigmond Lipot Esterházy of Galántha (1692–1693)

== Charitable acts ==
In 1671, he rescued some 3,000 Jews who had been expelled by Leopold I, Holy Roman Emperor from Vienna. This led to their resettlement as tenant farmers and the founding of the Seven Municipalities (German: Siebengemeinden) on Esterházy lands throughout Western Hungary, present-day Burgenland.

== Death and legacy ==
Family Tree of the Princes Esterházy of Galántha

Paul died in Eisenstadt on 26 March 1713. To secure his fortune, Paul founded the Austrian model of the fee tail and settled his successor in his will through the establishment of two primogeniture lines for his sons Michael and Joseph. In his will, Paul left his sons Michael and Joseph two estates which were meant to remain separate, but were rejoined under Joseph's ownership in 1721.

Paul was interred in the Esterházy family crypt at the Franziskanerkirche in the Franciscan Monastery in Eisenstadt.

Most of the Princely House of Esterházy's landholdings were acquired during Paul's reign as head of the family, but his lands incurred debts totaling 1,311,733 florins by 1711.

== Honours ==
- Knight of the Austrian Order of the Golden Fleece (1681)

== Ancestry ==
Ancestors of Paul I, Prince Esterházy

8. Benedek Zerhas de Zerhashaz
4. Ferenc Esterházy de Galántha
9. Ilona Bessenyei de Galántha
2. Miklós, Count Esterházy de Galántha
10. Tamás Illésházy de Illésháza
5. Zsófia Illésházy de Illésháza
11. Zsófia Földes
1. Paul I, Prince Esterházy of Galántha
12. Lőrinc Nyáry de Bedegh et Berencs
6. Baron Pál Nyáry de Bedegh et Berencs
13. Márta Thúróczy de Túróczszentmihály
3. Baroness Krisztina Nyáry de Bedegh
14. Miklós Várdai
7. Katalin Várday de Kisvárda
15. Dorottya Losonczi

== Sources ==
- Bain, Robert Nisbet (1911). "Esterházy of Galántha" . In Chisholm, Hugh (ed.). Encyclopædia Britannica. Vol. 09 (11th ed.). Cambridge University Press. pp. 794–795, see third para. "His third son Pál [Paul] (1635–1713), prince palatine..."
- Markó László: A Magyar Állam Főméltóságai Szent Istvántól napjainkig. Magyar életrajzi lexikon (Magyar Könyvklub, 2000) ISBN 963-547-085-1
- Csorba Csaba – Estók János – Salamon Konrád: Magyarország képes története (Magyar Könyvklub, 1998) ISBN 963-548-961-7

Paul I, Prince Esterházy House of Esterházy Born: 8 September 1635 Died: 26 March 1713
Hungarian nobility
Preceded by Ladislaus	Count Esterházy of Galántha; 16 August 1652 – 8 December 1687	Succeeded by himself as Prince
Preceded by himself as Count	Prince Esterházy of Galántha; 8 December 1687 – 26 March 1713	Succeeded by Michael I
Political offices
Preceded by Juraj Frankopan	Master of the household 1661 – 13 June 1681	Succeeded by Ivan Drašković
Preceded by Ferenc Wesselényi	Palatine of Hungary; 13 June 1681 – 26 March 1713	Succeeded by Miklós IX Pálffy
