= Bytča =

- Municipality
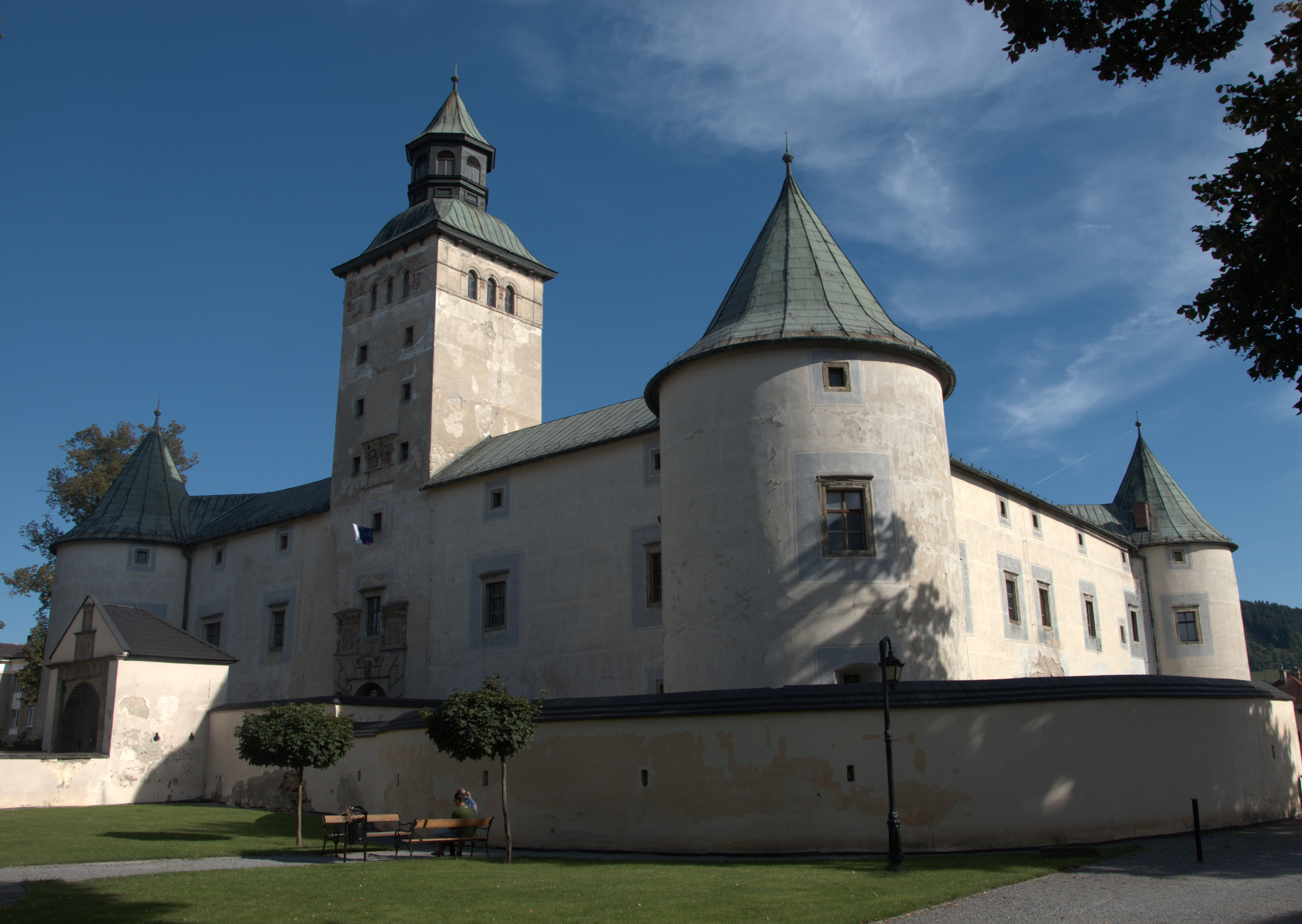
- Bytča Castle

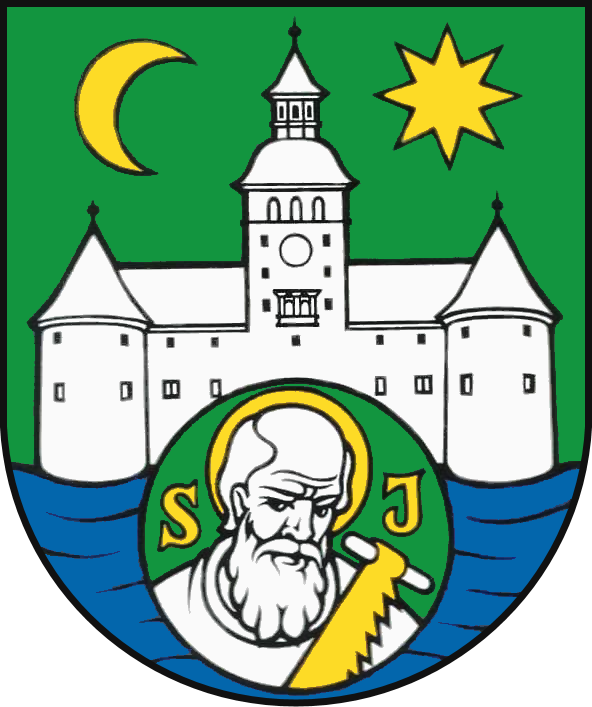
- Flag Coat of arms

- Location of Bytča in the Žilina Region Location of Bytča in Slovakia
- Coordinates: 49.22°N 18.56°E
- Country: Slovakia
- Region: Žilina Region
- District: Bytča District
- First mentioned: 1250

Government
  - Mayor: Miroslav Minárčik

Area
  - Total: 48.52 km^{2} (18.73 sq mi)
- Elevation: 337 m (1,106 ft)

Population (2025)
  - Total: 11,729
- Time zone: UTC+1 (CET)
  - Summer (DST): UTC+2 (CEST)
- Postal code: 140 1
- Area code: +421 41
- Vehicle registration plate (until 2022): BY
- Website: www.bytca.sk

Bytča (Hungarian: Nagybiccse) is a town in northwestern Slovakia. It is located on the Váh River near the cities of Žilina and Považská Bystrica. It belongs to Upper Váh region of tourism.

== Geography ==
The municipality lies at an altitude of 337 metres (1,106 ft) and covers an area of 48.52 km^{2} (18.73 sq mi) (2025).

== Etymology ==
The name comes from a Slavic personal name Bytek, Bytko → Bytča.

== History ==
The town arose in 1946 by a merger of the settlements Malá Bytča (including Beňov and Mikšová), Veľká Bytča and Hliník nad Váhom. The first written reference to the town's main part Veľká Bytča dates from 1234 as terra Bycha. The settlement got its town charter in 1378. It was the seat of a feudal dominion and later a town with many craftsmen. In Hungarian, it was known as Biccse.

== Landmarks ==
The town features a famous castle the Thurzó Castle built as a water castle by Pongrác Szentmiklósi in the 13th century and rebuilt in the 16th century in Renaissance style by Ferenc Thurzó. The town also houses the Wedding Palace (built by György Thurzó for his daughters' wedding) from 1601, which is the only building of this kind in Slovakia, Renaissance, Baroque and Classical bourgeoisie houses, an archive, and a museum (in the Wedding Palace).

== Population ==
Historical population
Year	Pop.	±%
1970	8,680	—
1980	10,819	+24.6%
1991	11,258	+4.1%
2001	11,550	+2.6%
2011	11,318	−2.0%
2021	11,414	+0.8%
Source: Censuses

Population statistic (10 years)
Year	1995	2005	2015	2025
Count	12,195	11,534	11,306	11,729
Difference		−5.42%	−1.97%	+3.74%

Population statistic
Year	2024	2025
Count	11,634	11,729
Difference		+0.81%

It has a population of 11,729 people (31 December 2025).

=== Ethnicity ===
Census 2021 (1+ %)
Ethnicity	Number	Fraction
Slovak	10,776	94.41%
Not found out	608	5.32%
Total	11,414	

In year 2021 was 11,414 people by ethnicity 10,776 as Slovak, 608 as Not found out, 76 as Czech, 17 as Other, 13 as Russian, 12 as German, 9 as Vietnamese, 8 as Polish, 7 as Ukrainian, 6 as Hungarian, 5 as Italian, 4 as Croatian, 4 as English, 3 as Jewish, 3 as Moravian, 3 as Bulgarian, 2 as Serbian, 2 as Rusyn, 2 as Austrian, 2 as French, 2 as Albanian, 1 as Romani and 1 as Korean.

Note on population: The difference values of population numbers in the table "Population statistic" and in the sections "Ethnicity" & "Religion" is caused by the use of various statistical methods.

=== Religion ===
Census 2021 (1+ %)
Religion	Number	Fraction
Roman Catholic Church	8732	76.5%
None	1535	13.45%
Not found out	733	6.42%
Evangelical Church	147	1.29%
Total	11,414	

In year 2021 was 11,414 people by religion 8732 from Roman Catholic Church, 1535 from None, 733 from Not found out, 147 from Evangelical Church, 73 from Christian Congregations in Slovakia, 51 from Greek Catholic Church, 38 from Other, 38 from Ad hoc movements, 11 from Calvinist Church, 10 from Eastern Orthodox Church, 10 from Paganism and natural spirituality, 9 from Buddhism, 8 from Other and not ascertained christian church, 4 from Islam, 4 from Church of the Brethren, 3 from Hinduism, 2 from Old Catholic Church, 2 from Jehovah's Witnesses, 1 from Jewish community, 1 from United Methodist Church, 1 from Seventh-day Adventist Church and 1 from Apostolic Church.

== Economy ==
Today, the town is home to machine (Kinex), textile, wood processing (sports equipment), and food (brewery) industries. The brewery closed in the 2010s.

== Boroughs ==
Bytča includes the following former villages: Psurnovice, Hrabove, Horne Hlboke, Dolne Hlboke, Hlboke nad Vahom, Benov, Miksova, Hlinik nad Vahom, Velka Bytca, Mala Bytca.

Current boroughs (year of merger in brackets):

- Beňov (c. 1899 with Malá Bytča, probably Hungarian name was Banya)
- Hliník nad Váhom (1946, Hungarian: Hlinik; also called Vágagyagos between 1899 and 1919)
- Hrabové (1971; Hungarian: Hrabova; also called Rabó between 1899 and 1919)
- Malá Bytča (1946; Hungarian: Kisbiccse, German: Klein-Bitsch; also called Miksofalva from 1907 to 1919)
- Mikšová (1907 with Malá Bytča, Hungarian: Miksófalvá)
- Pšurnovice (1971; Hungarian: Psurnovicz; also called Legelővölgy between 1899 and 1919)
- Veľká Bytča (1946; Hungarian: Nagybiccse, German: Groß-Bitsch)

== Twin towns — sister cities ==
Bytča is twinned with:

- Karolinka, Czech Republic
- Opoczno, Poland

== Notable people ==
- Adolf Neubauer, Jewish scholar
- Jozef Tiso (1887–1947), Slovak priest, politician and leader of the First Slovak Republic (1939–1945) executed for war crimes

== See also ==
- List of municipalities and towns in Slovakia

== Genealogical resources ==
The records for genealogical research are available at the state archive "Statny Archiv in Bytca, Slovakia"

- Roman Catholic church records (births/marriages/deaths): 1630-1900 (parish A)
