= Judit Rumy =

Hungarian noblewoman (1606-1663)

- Lady of Rum and Rábadoroszló
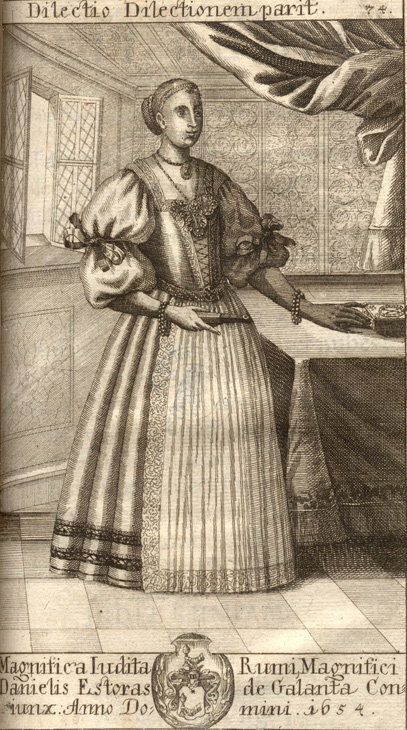
- Full name: Judit Rumy de Rum et Rábadoroszló
- Born: 11 January 1606
- Died: 1663 (aged 56–57); Nagyszombat, Kingdom of Hungary (today: Trnava, Slovakia)
- Noble family: House of Rumy; House of Esterházy
- Spouse: Baron Dániel Esterházy de Galántha (1623–1654)
- Issue: See below for issue
- Father: Judit Rumy de Rum et Rábadoroszló
- Mother: Anna Debreczenyi

Judit Rumy de Rum et Rábadoroszló (11 January 1606 – 1663) was a Hungarian noblewoman, wife of Dániel Esterházy, the founder of the Csesznek branch of the House of Esterházy. She was the lady of Gáta (today: Gattendorf, Austria, Hungarian: Lajtakáta). Later, her property belonged to the Esterházy family.

== Family ==
Her grandfather was Vice-ispán of Vas County Ferenc Rumy. Baron Dániel and she married on 20 February 1623. They had several children:

- Zsófia (16 March 1624 – 26 March 1624), died as an infant
- János (27 January 1625 – 22 June 1692), created Count in 1683
- Tamás (20 December 1625 – 26 August 1652), killed in the Battle of Vezekény
- Zsigmond (30 December 1626 – 1692)
- Gáspár (13 January 1628 – 26 August 1652), killed in the Battle of Vezekény
- Mihály (28 February 1629 – 27 July 1686), killed in the Battle of Buda
- György (25 March 1630 – 9 August 1663), Titular Bishop of Szendrő, killed in the Battle of Párkány
- Ádám (1631 – 12 August 1638), died young
- Mária Magdolna (19 February 1633 – 1672), married to Count András Serényi de Kisserény (d. 1689) in 1672
- Anna (11 March 1634 – 22 November 1635), died young
- Krisztina (1 August 1635 – 31 December 1640), died young
- Gábor (5 September 1637 – 8 September 1637), died as an infant (twin)
- András (5 September 1637 – September 1643), died young (twin)
- Imre (15 September 1638 – 1670)
- István (19 January 1640 – 4 February 1643), died young
- János (2 February 1643 – 4 February 1643), died as an infant
