= Tamás Esterházy =

Tamás Esterházy may refer to:

- Tamás Esterházy (1570–1616), son of Ferenc Esterházy
- Tamás Esterházy (1625–1652), son of Dániel Esterházy
