= Dániel Esterházy =

Hungarian noble (1585-1654)

- Baron of Galántha
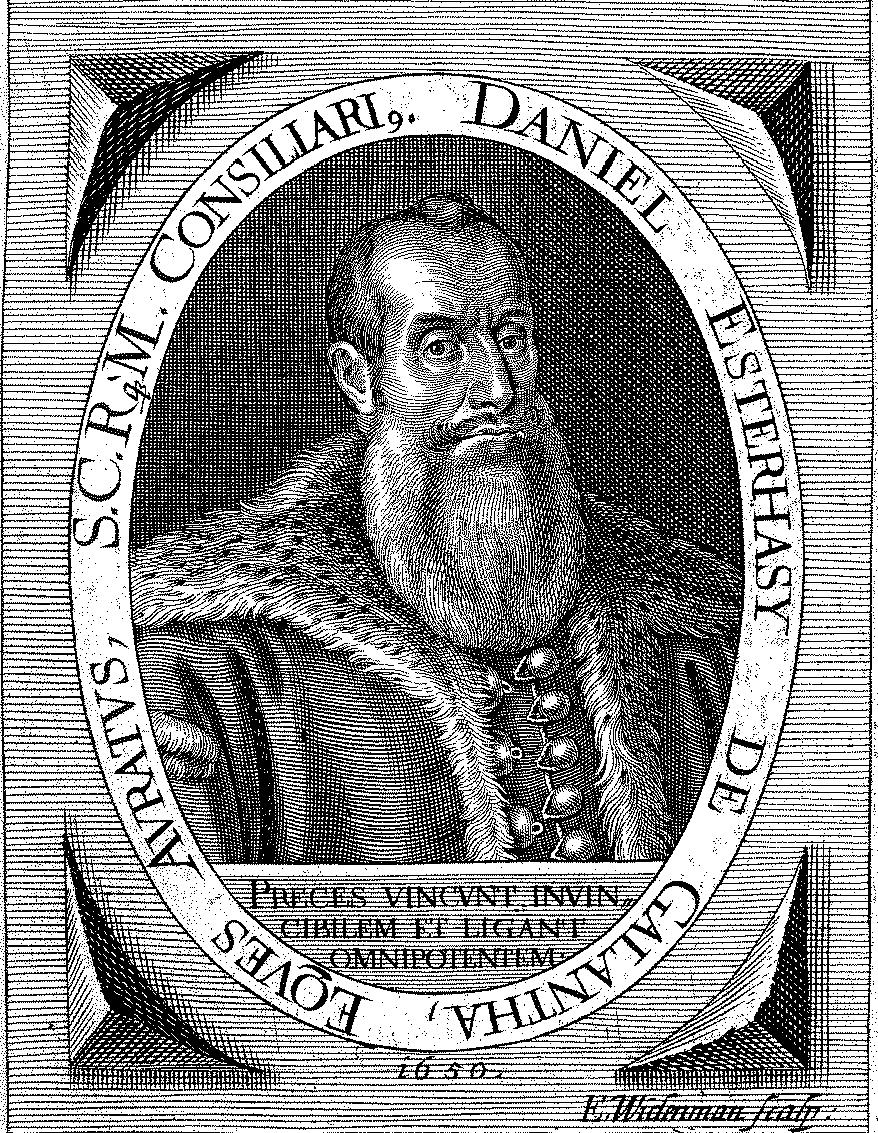
- Full name: Baron Dániel Esterházy de Galántha
- Born: July 26, 1585; Galántha, Kingdom of Hungary (today: Galanta, Slovakia)
- Died: June 14, 1654 (aged 68); Sempte, Kingdom of Hungary (today: Šintava, Slovakia)
- Noble family: House of Esterházy
- Spouse: Judit Rumy de Rum et Rábadoroszló (1623–1654)
- Issue: See below for issue
- Father: Ferenc Esterházy de Galántha
- Mother: Zsófia Illésházy de Illésháza

Baron Dániel Esterházy de Galántha (26 July 1585 – 14 June 1654) was a Hungarian noble, son of Vice-ispán (Viscount; vicecomes) of Pozsony County Ferenc Esterházy. He was the founder of the Csesznek branch of the House of Esterházy. His brother was, among others, Nikolaus, Count Esterházy who served as Palatine of Hungary.

== Life ==
He participated in Bocskay's War of Independence at the age of twenty. Later, he was a supporter of Gabriel Bethlen, Prince of Transylvania. As a result, he had a conflict with his brother, Nikolaus (Miklós). However Bethlen imprisoned him because of his sympathy for Palatine György Thurzó's royalist party. Dániel escaped from the prison.

Dániel was created Baron in 1613. In 1635, King Ferdinand II gave him the castle of Csesznek which was then a stronghold of Győr (Raab). Baron Dániel founded the Csesznek branch.

== Family ==
Baron Dániel Esterházy married to Judit Rumy de Rum et Rábadoroszló, granddaughter of Vice-ispán of Vas County Ferenc Rumy, on 20 February 1623. They had several children:

- Zsófia (16 March 1624 – 26 March 1624), died as an infant
- János (27 January 1625 – 22 June 1692), created Count in 1683
- Tamás (20 December 1625 – 26 August 1652), killed in the Battle of Vezekény
- Zsigmond (30 December 1626 – 1692)
- Gáspár (13 January 1628 – 26 August 1652), killed in the Battle of Vezekény
- Mihály (28 February 1629 – 27 July 1686), killed in the Battle of Buda
- György (25 March 1630 – 9 August 1663), Titular Bishop of Szendrő, killed in the Battle of Párkány
- Ádám (1631 – 12 August 1638), died young
- Mária Magdolna (19 February 1633 – 1672), married to Count András Serényi de Kisserény (d. 1689) in 1672
- Anna (11 March 1634 – 22 November 1635), died young
- Krisztina (1 August 1635 – 31 December 1640), died young
- Gábor (5 September 1637 – 8 September 1637), died as an infant (twin)
- András (5 September 1637 – September 1643), died young (twin)
- Imre (15 September 1638 – 1670)
- István (19 January 1640 – 4 February 1643), died young
- János (2 February 1643 – 4 February 1643), died as an infant
