= Kálmán Hunyady de Kéthely =

Hungarian aristocrat

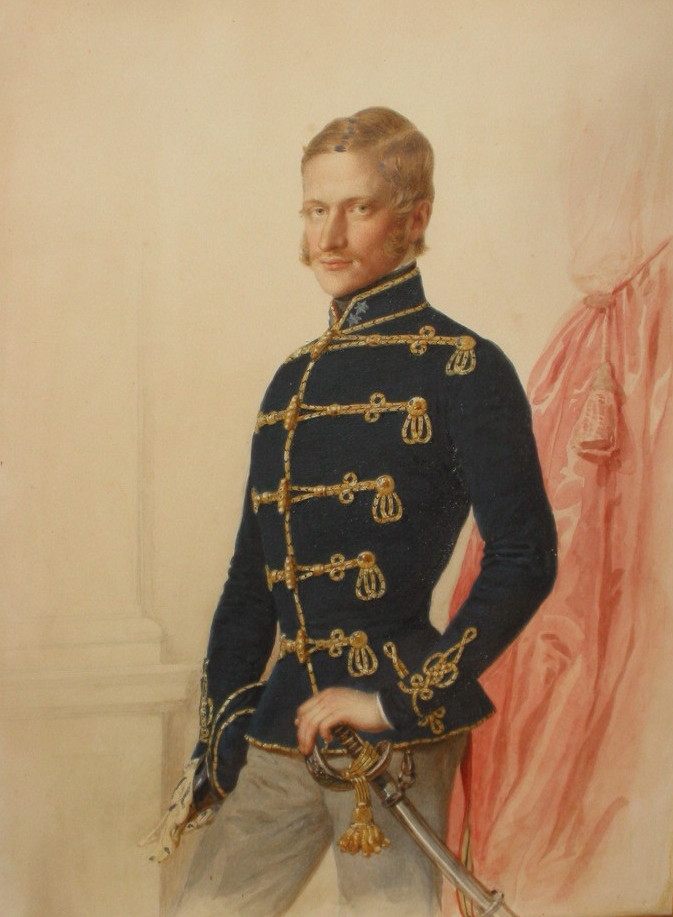
- Portrait of Count Kálmán Hunyady de Kéthely (19th century)
- Born: Kálmán Hunyady de Kéthely; 13 October 1828; Vienna, Austrian Empire
- Died: 17 May 1901 (aged 72); Pozsonyivánka, Austro-Hungarian Empire
- Citizenship: Hungarian
- Spouse: Countess Alexandrine von Buol-Schauenstein
- Children: Count Károly Ferenc Hunyady de Kéthely, Countess Júlia von Boos zu Waldeck
- Parent(s): Count Ferenc Hunyady de Kéthely, Countess Júlia Zichy de Zich et Vásonkeő
- Relatives: Júlia Hunyady de Kéthely

Count Kálmán Hunyady de Kéthely (13 October 1828 – 17 May 1901) was a Hungarian aristocrat, horse rider and by birth member of the prominent Hunyady de Kéthely family.

== Early life ==
Kálmán was born as the second son Count Ferenc Hunyady de Kéthely (1804–1882) and his wife, Countess Júlia Zichy de Zich et Vásonkeő (1808–1873). His other siblings were his brother Count László Hunyady de Kéthely (1826-1898) and a sister, Princess Julia of Serbia.

== Biography ==
He was the first president of the Viennese Harness Racing Club (Wiener Trabrenn-Verein) that was founded in 1874. Four years later the club opened a racing track in Leopoldstadt, Vienna. Krieau racecourse is the second oldest race track in Europe.

Hunyady died in 1901 and a horse race was soon established for his honour. The annual Graf Kalman Hunyady Memorial at Krieau is one of the oldest international races in European harness racing.

Kálmán Hunyady's sister was Júlia Hunyady de Kéthely. She was the Princess consort of Serbia as the wife of Mihailo Obrenović III.

== Personal life ==
On 6 October 1862 he married Countess Alexandrine von Buol-Schauenstein (1837-1901). They had one son and one daughter:

- Count Károly Ferenc Mátyás Hunyady de Kéthely (1864-1933), married to Countess Maria Nádasdy de Nádasd et Fogarasföld (1873-1925); had issue
- Countess Julia Hunyady de Kéthely (1867-1943), married to Count Hugo Alexander Klemens Wenzeslaus von Boos zu Waldeck und Montfort (1869-1945); had issue
