= Ferenc Esterházy (1533–1604) =

Hungarian noble

- Lord of Galántha
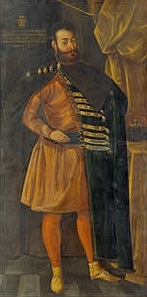
- Full name: Ferenc Esterházy de Galántha
- Born: 1533
- Died: 1604 (aged 70–71); Galántha, Kingdom of Hungary (today: Galanta, Slovakia)
- Noble family: House of Esterházy
- Spouse: Zsófia Illésházy de Illésháza (m. 1566; died 1599)
- Issue: 13, including: Gábor, Miklós, Dániel, Pál
- Father: Benedek Zerhas de Zerhashaz
- Mother: Ilona Bessenyei de Galántha

Ferenc Esterházy de Galántha (English: Francis Esterházy of Galántha; 1533–1604) was a Hungarian noble, who served as Vice-ispán (Viscount; vicecomes) of Pozsony County since 1579. He was the ancestor of the wealthy and prestigious House of Esterházy.

== Early life ==
His parents were Benedek Zerhas de Zerhashaz (or Eszterhas), from the kindred of Salamon, and Ilona Bessenyei de Galántha. He was the first from his family who used the title of "Galántha" (galánthai) when he inherited the lordship of Galánta (today: Galanta, Slovakia) from his mother.

== Career ==
Following his father's death in 1553, he built a Renaissance-style mansion in 1600. Another, Neo-Gothic castle situated in the town built by two of his sons, Dániel and Pál in 1633.

Ferenc participated in the 1596 campaign against the Ottoman Empire. He served in the army under commander Count Miklós Pálffy. His son, István was killed in the Battle of Keresztes on 26 October 1596.

== Personal life ==
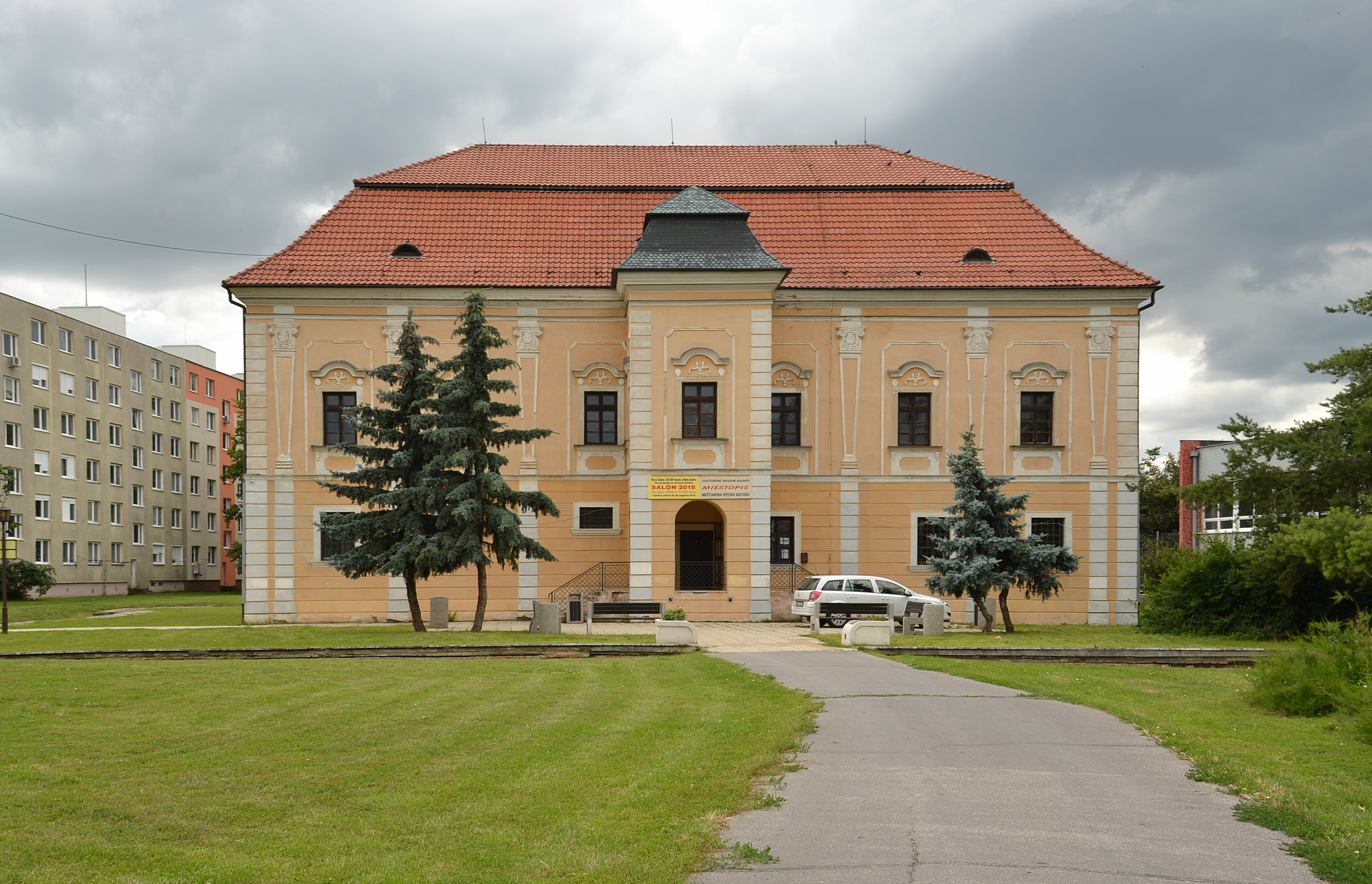
Mansion in Galanta built by Ferenc Esterházy

In 1566, Esterházy was married to Zsófia Illésházy de Illésháza (1547–1599), sister of Palatine István Illésházy. Together, they were the parents of thirteen children, including:

- Magdolna Esterházy (1567–1616), who married László Kubinyi de Felsőkubin et Nagyolaszi.
- Ferenc Esterházy I (b. 1568), who died young.
- Tamás Esterházy (1570–1615/6), who studied at the University of Wittenberg and converted to Calvinism.
- István Esterházy (1572–1596), who died at the Battle of Keresztes.
- János Esterházy (b. 1574), who died young.
- Ferenc Esterházy II (b. 1576), who died young.
- Farkas Esterházy (1577–1643)
- Zsófia Esterházy (1578–1620), who married Márton Révay de Riva et Trebosztó, who served as Vice-ispán of Turóc County.
- Gábor Esterházy (1580–1626), who received the title of Baron in 1613.
- Miklós Esterházy (1583–1645), who received the title of Baron in 1613, the title of Count in 1626, founder of the Fraknó branch, who served as Palatine of Hungary from 1625 to 1645; he is ancestor of the Princely House of Esterházy.
- Dániel Esterházy (1585–1654), who received the title of Baron in 1613, founder of the Csesznek branch.
- Pál Esterházy (1587–1645), who received the title of Baron in 1613, founder of the Zólyom branch.
- Anna Esterházy (1590–1638), married Count János Kéry de Kiskér, who served as Vice-ispán of Zólyom County.

Esterházy died at Galántha, Kingdom of Hungary in 1604.

== Sources ==
- Berényi, László (2000). "Esterházy Ferenc alispán". Turul (in Hungarian). 73 (3–4). Hungarian Heraldry and Genealogical Society: 93–96. ISSN 1216-7258.
- Pálffy, Géza (2009). "Pozsony megyéből a Magyar Királyság élére. Karrierlehetőségek a magyar arisztokráciában a 16–17. század fordulóján (Az Esterházy, a Pálffy és az Illésházy család felemelkedése)". Századok (in Hungarian). 143 (4). Magyar Történelmi Társulat: 853–882. ISSN 0039-8098.
