= Tamás Esterházy (1625–1652) =

17th-century Hungarian soldier and nobleman

- Baron of Galántha
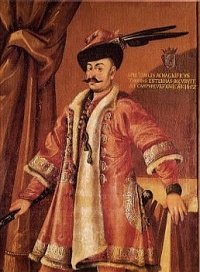
- Full name: Baron Tamás Esterházy de Galántha
- Born: 20 December 1625; Beckó, Kingdom of Hungary (today: Beckov, Slovakia)
- Died: 26 August 1652 (aged 26); Vezekény, Kingdom of Hungary (today: Veľké Vozokany, Slovakia)
- Noble family: House of Esterházy
- Father: Baron Dániel Esterházy de Galántha
- Mother: Judit Rumy de Rum et Rábadoroszló
- Occupation: Soldier

Baron Tamás Esterházy de Galántha (20 December 1625 – 26 August 1652) was a Hungarian noble from the Csesznek branch of the Esterházy family as the son of Baron Dániel Esterházy and Judit Rumy.

Esterházy served as deputy castellan of the Fortress of Déva and also fought in Bohemia, Saxony under the command of Miklós Zrínyi. He was killed in the Battle of Vezekény in 1652, along with his younger brother Gáspár, and his cousins, Ladislaus, Count Esterházy, the head of the family and Ferenc, the firstborn son of Baron Pál Esterházy.

== Sources ==
- The Battle of Vezekény (in Hungarian)
