= Zsófia Illésházy =

Hungarian noblewoman (1547-1599)

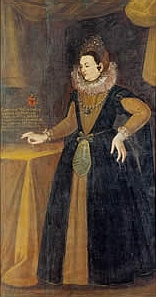
- Full name: Zsófia Katalin Illésházy de Illésháza
- Born: 1547
- Died: 1599 (aged 51–52); Galántha, Kingdom of Hungary (today: Galanta, Slovakia)
- Noble family: House of Illésházy
- Spouse: Ferenc Esterházy de Galántha (1566–1599)
- Issue: 13, including: Gábor, Miklós, Dániel, Pál
- Father: Tamás Illésházy de Illésháza
- Mother: Zsófia Földes

Zsófia Katalin Illésházy de Illésháza (1547–1599) was a Hungarian noblewoman.

== Early life ==
Zsófia was the sixth and youngest child of Tamás Illésházy and his second wife, Zsófia Földes. Her father functioned as Vice-ispán (Viscount; vicecomes) of Pozsony County. Her elder brother was Baron István Illésházy, who served as Palatine of Hungary between 1608 and 1609. Her father's first wife, Anna Csogány Pogány, was a descendant of the ancient Cséb Pogány family.

== Personal life ==
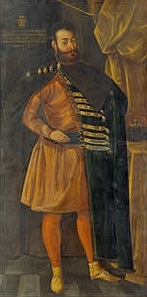
Her husband, Ferenc Esterházy de Galántha

In 1566, she married Ferenc Esterházy de Galántha (1533–1604), a member of the prestigious House of Esterházy who was the first of his family who used the title of "Galántha" (galánthai) when he inherited the lordship of Galánta (today: Galanta, Slovakia) from his mother. Ferenc was the son of Benedek Zerhas de Zerhashaz, and Ilona Bessenyei de Galántha. Together, they were the parents of the following children:

- Magdolna Esterházy (1567–1616), who married László Kubinyi de Felsőkubin et Nagyolaszi.
- Ferenc Esterházy I (b. 1568), who died young.
- Tamás Esterházy (1570–1615/6), who studied at the University of Wittenberg and converted to Calvinism.
- István Esterházy (1572–1596), who died at the Battle of Keresztes.
- János Esterházy (b. 1574), who died young.
- Ferenc Esterházy II (b. 1576), who died young.
- Farkas Esterházy (1577–1643)
- Zsófia Esterházy (1578–1620), who married Márton Révay de Riva et Trebosztó, who served as Vice-ispán of Turóc County.
- Gábor Esterházy (1580–1626), who received the title of Baron in 1613.
- Miklós Esterházy (1583–1645), who received the title of Baron in 1613, the title of Count in 1626, founder of the Fraknó branch, who served as Palatine of Hungary from 1625 to 1645; he is ancestor of the Princely House of Esterházy.
- Dániel Esterházy (1585–1654), who received the title of Baron in 1613, founder of the Csesznek branch.
- Pál Esterházy (1587–1645), who received the title of Baron in 1613, founder of the Zólyom branch.
- Anna Esterházy (1590–1638), married Count János Kéry de Kiskér.

Zsófia died at Galántha, Kingdom of Hungary in 1599.
