= Gábor Esterházy (1580–1626) =

- Baron of Galántha
- Full name: Baron Gábor Esterházy de Galántha
- Born: 8 October 1580
- Died: 28 December 1626 (aged 46)
- Noble family: Esterházy
- Spouses: Anna Ujfalussy de Divékujfalu (m. 1612; died 1618) Mária Dersffy de Szerdahely (m. 1619)
- Issue: Farkas Esterházy; Judit Esterházy
- Father: Ferenc Esterházy de Galántha
- Mother: Zsófia Illésházy de Illésháza

Baron Gábor Esterházy de Galántha (8 October 1580 – 28 December 1626) was a Hungarian noble, son of Vice-ispán (Viscount; vicecomes) of Pozsony County Ferenc Esterházy. His brother was, among others, Nikolaus, Count Esterházy who served as Palatine of Hungary.

Gábor was created Baron in 1613. He was a supporter of Gabriel Bethlen.

== Family ==
Gábor Esterházy married twice: his first wife was Anna Ujfalussy de Divékujfalu after 1612. Anna died in 1618. One year later Gábor married to Mária Dersffy de Szerdahely. Mária's sister, Orsolya was the first wife of Nikolaus, Count Esterházy, Gábor's brother. Gábor Esterházy had two children:

- Farkas (1614–1670), served as Chief Justice (személynök) of Hungary (1667–1670)
- Judit (? – 1676), married Baron János Amade de Várkony et Böős in 1643
