= Hunyady de Kéthely =

Austro-Hungarian noble family

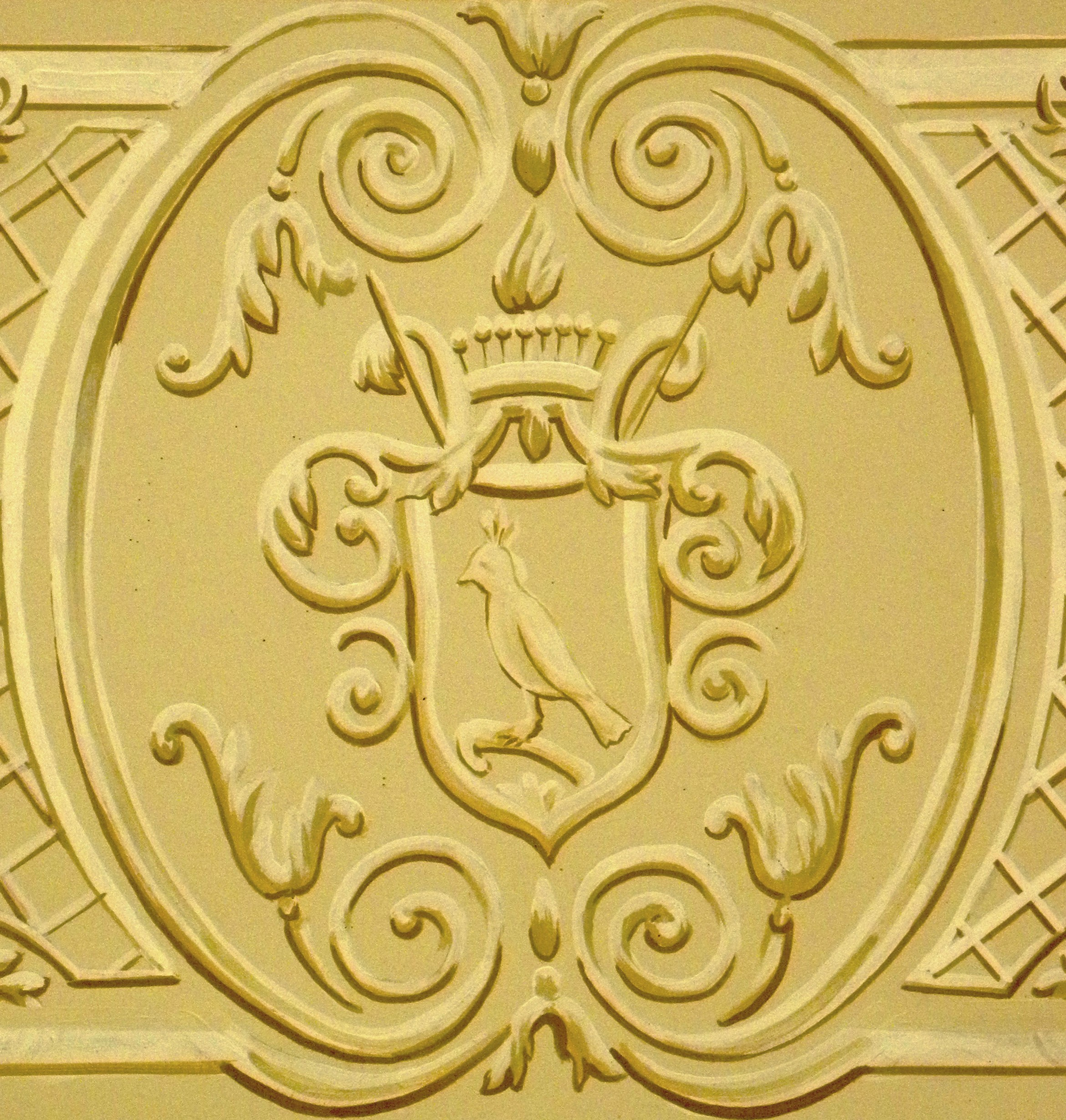
Coat of arms of Counts Hunyady de Kethely

The Hunyady de Kéthely family (German: Hunyady von Kéthely) is an Austro-Hungarian noble house whose members occupied important positions within the Empire.

== History ==
Their coat of arms was recognized in 1792 when the family received the title of Count in Hungary and in 1797 when they received the title of Imperial Count from Emperor Francis II. Although with the same name, the family was not connected to House of Hunyadi which ruled in Hungary in the 15th and the beginning of the 16th century.

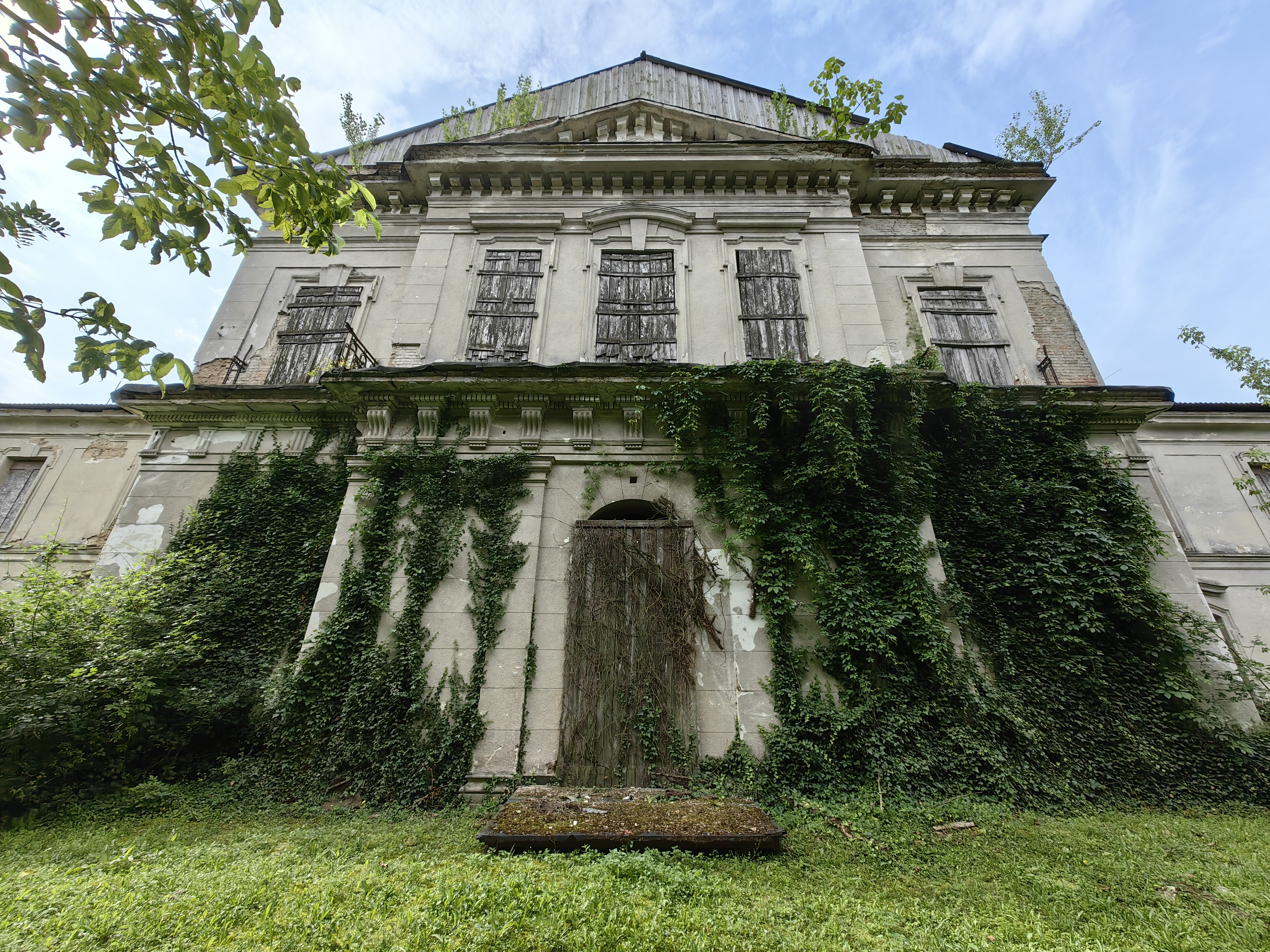
Hunyady de Kéthely Castle in Kéthely, Hungary.

== Members ==
- Ferenc Hunyady de Kiskresztyen (d. c. 1690), married Erzsébet Varsányi de Varsány et Simony
  - László Hunyady de Kéthely (d. 1723)
- Franciscus Hunyady de Kéthely (fl. 1727)
- Joseph Hunyady von Kéthely (fl. 1808), count, chamberlain, obersthofmeister
- János Nepomuk Hunyady de Kéthely (1773–1821), count; married Countess Mária Franciska Pálffy of Erdöd
  - Joseph Hunyady von Kéthely (1801–1869), count; married Princess Henriette of Liechtenstein (a daughter of Johann I Joseph, Prince of Liechtenstein)
    - Janos Hunyady de Kéthely (1826–1861)
    - Imre Joachim Ferenc Hunyady de Kéthely (1827–1902), married Countess Felicie Győry de Radvány (1842-1913), lady in waiting at the Imperial Court of Austria
    - Franciska Hunyady de Kéthely (1832–1910), married Count Lajos de Bombelles (1817-1909)
    - Sophie Hunyady de Kéthely (1835–1869), married Count Ottokar von Winckenburg (*15.8.1831 +22.8.1904)
    - Karoline Hunyady de Kéthely (1836–1907), lady-in-waiting to Empress Elisabeth of Austria
    - Maria Hunyady de Kéthely (1838–1908), married Prince Camillo Borghese Aldobrandini (1816-1902)
  - Ferenc Hunyady de Kéthely (1804–1882), count; married Countess Júlia Zichy de Zich et Vásonkeö (1808-1875)
    - Count László Hunyady de Kéthely (1826–1898), married Countess Sarolta Csáky de Köröszegh et Adorján (*30.11.1828 +13.5.1906
    - Kálmán Hunyady de Kéthely (1828–1901), married Countess Alexandra von Buol-Schauenstein (1837-1901)
    - Vilmos Hunyady de Kéthely (b. 1830)
    - Júlia Hunyady de Kéthely (1831–1919), married firstly Mihailo Obrenović, Prince of Serbia, married secondly Duke Charles of Arenberg (1831–1896)

== Sources ==
- Genealogisches Taschenbuch der deutschen gräflichen Häuser. Perthes. pp. 398–400.
- Gothaisches genealogisches Taschenbuch der gräflichen Häuser. Justus Perthes. 1911. pp. 421–422.
- http://www.hunyady.hu/familyhistory.html
