= István Esterházy =

István Esterházy may refer to:

- István Esterházy (1572–1596), son of Ferenc Esterházy
- István Esterházy (1616–1641), son of Nikolaus, Count Esterházy
