= Júlia Hunyady de Kéthely =

Júlia Hunyady de Kéthely Јулија Хуњади де Кетељ
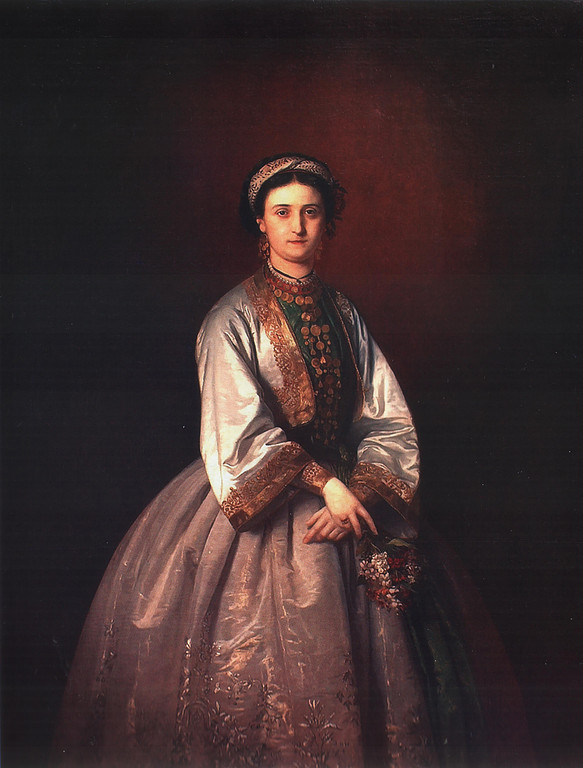

Princess consort of Serbia
- Tenure: 26 September 1860 – 10 June 1868
- Born: 26 August 1831; Vienna, Austrian Empire
- Died: 19 February 1919 (aged 87); Vienna, German Austria
- Burial: Vienna Central Cemetery
- Spouse: Mihailo Obrenović, Prince of Serbia (m. 1853; died 1868); Duke Charles of Arenberg (m. 1876; died 1896)
- House: Hunyady de Kéthely (by birth); Obrenović (by marriage); Arenberg (by marriage)
- Father: Count Ferenc Hunyady de Kéthely
- Mother: Countess Júlia Zichy de Zich et Vásonkeő
- Religion: Roman Catholic

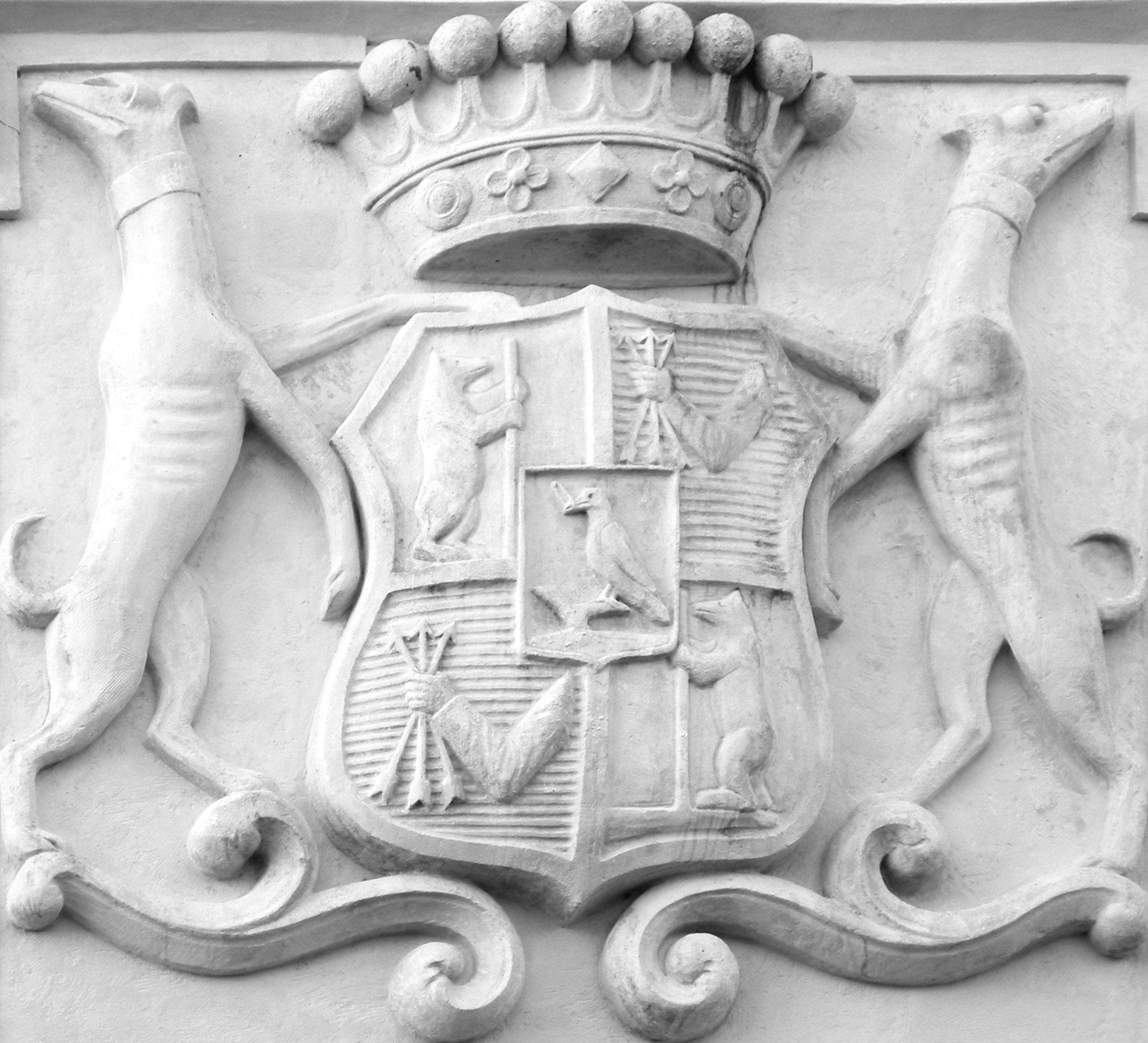
Coat of arms of the Counts Hunyady de Kéthely

Countess Júlia Hunyady de Kéthely (Serbian: Јулија Хуњади де Кетељ; 26 August 1831 – 19 February 1919), was a Hungarian noblewoman and the Princess consort of Serbia as the wife of Prince Mihailo Obrenović III. She remained a widow for seven and a half years after his assassination in 1868, until January 1876 when she married her lover, Duke Karl von Arenberg, Prince von Recklinghausen.

== Life ==
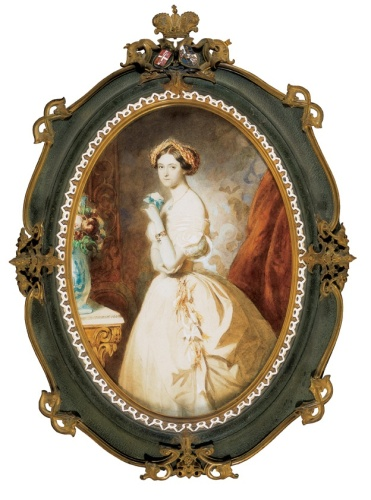
Júlia Hunyady (Bernard, 1855)

Júlia was born in Vienna into an old, noble Hungarian family, the only daughter of Count Ferenc Hunyady de Kéthely (1804–1882) and Countess Júlia Zichy de Zich et Vásonkeő (1808–1873). She had three brothers, László (1826-1898), Kálmán and Vilmos (b. 1830). On 1 August 1853, less than a month before her 22nd birthday, she married her first husband Mihailo Obrenović, the deposed ruler of Serbia.

=== Princess of Serbia ===
On 26 September 1860, after the death of his father Miloš Obrenović, he once again assumed power as the ruler of Serbia, making Julia, the Princess consort. She was not popular with the Serbs as they mistrusted her Catholic religion and Hungarian background. Prince Mihailo was not a faithful husband, and he had at least one illegitimate son. His last mistress was Katarina Konstantinović, the young, pretty daughter of his first cousin, Princess Anka Obrenović, both of whom resided at the royal court at Mihailo's request. Katarina had even entertained hopes of eventually becoming Mihailo's wife on account of Julia's inability to bear the Prince a child, and Mihailo was considering a divorce in spite of the national outrage such a move would invariably cause. In 1867, the esteemed Prime Minister Ilija Garasanin was dismissed from his post for having voiced his opposition to Mihailo's proposed divorce and marriage to Katarina. Katarina openly despised Princess Júlia and made her life miserable by flaunting her affair with Mihailo. Júlia retaliated by conducting her own love affair with Duke Karl von Arenberg (1831–1896). Duke Karl was a younger son of Prosper Louis, 7th Duke of Arenberg and a second cousin once removed of the Empress Sissi.

=== Later life ===
On 10 June 1868, Mihailo was taking a stroll through the park of Košutnjak, close to the royal summer residence on the outskirts of Belgrade. He was in the company of Princess Anka and his mistress, Katarina. All three were shot by assassins, leaving Prince Mihailo and Princess Anka dead, while Katarina was wounded. It was believed at the time that the assassination was the work of the Karađorđević, the rival dynasty of the Obrenović. Mihailo was succeeded by Milan IV, his cousin and the son of Princess Anka's brother, Miloš. Milan would in 1882 reign as King Milan I of Serbia.

The same year Mihailo was assassinated, Katarina married General Milivoje Blaznavac and later assumed the role of first lady at her cousin, King Milan's court, when the latter's wife, Queen Natalija separated from him to live abroad. Julia continued her love affair with Duke Karl, finally marrying him on 16 January 1876 at Ivanka pri Dunaji. She became Duchess von Arenberg and Princess von Recklinghausen upon her second marriage.

She died, childless, in her birthplace of Vienna on 19 February 1919. She was 87 years old.

== See also ==
- List of Serbian consorts

Royal titles
Preceded by Persida Nenadović	Princess consort of Serbia; 26 September 1860 – 10 June 1868	Succeeded by Natalija Keşco
