= Paul Esterházy =

Paul or Pál Esterházy may refer to several members of the House of Esterházy:

== Princely House of Esterházy ==
- Paul I, Prince Esterházy (1635–1713), poet, harpsichordist, and composer
- Paul II Anton, Prince Esterházy (1711–1762), Field Marshal and patron of music
- Paul III Anton, Prince Esterházy (1786–1866), Hungarian diplomat

=== Other family members ===
- Pál Esterházy (1587–1645), founder of the Zólyom branch

== See also ==
- Esterházy
