= László Hunyady de Kéthely =

Hungarian politician (died 1723)

- Born: László Hunyady de Kéthely; Unknown
- Died: 4 July 1723; Cserenye
- Citizenship: Hungarian
- Known for: politician
- Spouse(s): Mária Perényi de Perény; Anna Sándor de Szlavnicza
- Parent(s): Ferenc Hunyady de Kéthely; Erzsébet Varsányi de Varsány et Simony

Count László Hunyady de Kéthely (? – 4 July 1723, Cserenye) was a Hungarian nobleman and designate personalis from the prominent Hunyady family.

== Early life ==
His parents were Count Ferenc Hunyady de Kéthely (d. c. 1690) and Erzsébet Varsányi de Varsány et Simony. He had one brother and five sisters.

== Career ==
He served as clerk and secretary of Prince Pál Esterházy de Galántha, the Palatine of Hungary. Hunyady was appointed personalis (the representative of the King's person in the jurisdiction) in 1723 but he died before taking the office.

== Personal life ==
He married twice: his first wife was Baroness Mária Perényi de Perény and his second wife was Anna Sándor de Szlavnicza. He had a son.
