= Chief Justice of Hungary =

Position in Hungary

Chief Justice of the Kingdom of Hungary
- Residence: Buda (1514–1536; 1784–1867); Pressburg (1536–1784)
- Appointer: King of Hungary
- Precursor: Secret Chancellor
- Formation: 15th century (1464)
- First holder: Janus Pannonius
- Final holder: István Melczer
- Abolished: 1867
- Succession: President of the Curia Regia

The chief justice (Hungarian: királyi személynök, Latin: personalis praesentiae regiae in judiciis locumtenens, German: Königliche Personalis) was the personal legal representative of the king of Hungary, who issued decrees of judicial character on behalf of the monarch authenticated with the royal seal, performed national notarial activities and played an important role in the organisation of lawyers training. Later the chief justice was the head of the Royal Court of Justice (Hungarian: Királyi Ítélőtábla, Latin: Tabula Regia Iudiciaria) and the Tribunal of the Chief Justice (Hungarian: személynöki szék, Latin: sedes personalitia), the highest legal forum of civil cases.

== Origins ==
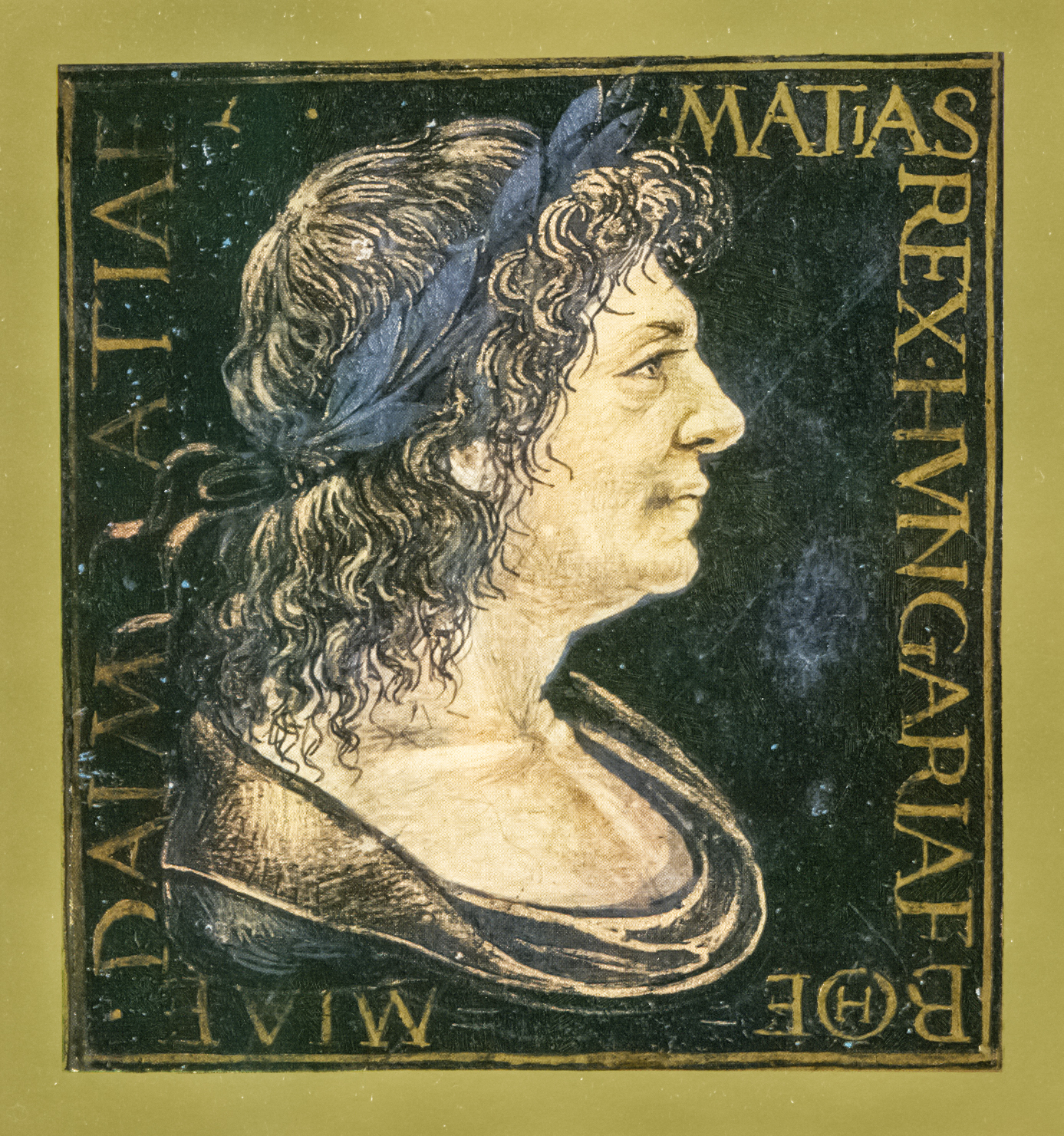
Matthias Corvinus

The office of personalis evolved since the early 15th century within the royal chancellery. In the beginning, the king was represented by the secret chancellor in the judiciary (judge of personal presence). The first known chief justice was Janus Pannonius, a Croato-Hungarian humanist poet who returned to Hungary after finishing studies at the University of Padua in 1458, the coronation year of Matthias Corvinus. Pannonius served as chief justice until 1459, when he was elected as the bishop of Pécs. Until the 1464 reform, the complete list of chief justices is unknown. It is certain that Albert Vetési, Bishop of Veszprém held the office for a short time around 1460.

From the 1370s, during the reign of Louis I, the lord chancellor also had a judicial function. He became judge of special presence (Latin: specialis presentia regia). This position was held by Roman Catholic prelates, therefore the judicial function was performed by their deputies. Consequently, a dual judicial system existed in the Kingdom of Hungary until the administrative reform of 1464.

=== Formation ===
Matthias Corvinus (formally Matthias I), after restoring the Holy Crown of Hungary for 60,000 ducats, was allowed to retain certain Hungarian counties with the title of king and was crowned legitimately on 29 March 1464. After the second and valid coronation, Matthias began to reorganize the administrative and judicial structure. He merged the two courts ("special" and "personal judicatures") and established the institution of chief justice as a full-fledged judge to the head of the Royal Court. The chancellery was also unified and the new office of "lord- and vice-chancellor" lost all of its judicial functions.

The Tribunal of the Chief Justice also established where the so-called "towns of chief justice" (Hungarian: személynöki város) forwarded those appeals concerning litigations. The tribunal chaired by the chief justice functioned as appellate court for the "towns of treasurer" (Hungarian: tárnoki város) too. According to the Tripartitum (1514) five settlements were towns of chief justice: Székesfehérvár, Esztergom, Lőcse (Levoča), Kisszeben (Sabinov) and Szakolca (Skalica). The status meant some independence, so was sought after by the towns. The Quadripartitum (1551), which never came to force, also mentions the seven mining towns of Upper Hungary as towns of chief justice.

== Functions and development ==
The Act LXVIII of 1486 listed the chief justice among the "ordinary judges" beside the palatine and the judge royal. The chief justice also served as keeper of the monarch's judicial seal. In contrast, the secret chancellor assumed his role in the arbitration only on special occasions. The ordinary judges were able to make judgements on any matter and also could appoint deputies and masters of judgement. In practice, this meant that the judicial power decoupled itself from the executive branch (the king). The Act XLII of 1492 (during the reign of Vladislaus II) also confirmed these authorities.

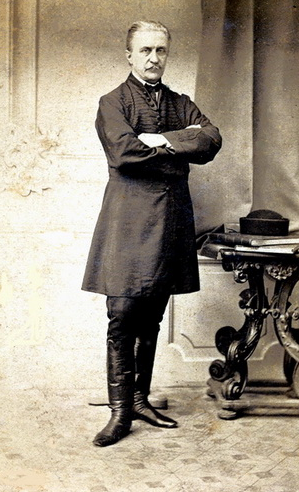
István Melczer, the last chief justice of Hungary (1861–1867)

During the first decades the position was held by ecclesiastical dignitaries. Thomas Drági was the first secular office-holder between 1486 and 1490. There had been a growing demand to fill the position by secular jurists and professionals on a permanent basis. That finally occurred at the beginning of the 16th century when the Act IV of 1507 decreed that the office must be occupied by a secular person with legal practice. Despite the new law the influential and powerful cardinal Tamás Bakócz chose his prelate relatives for the office. The importance of the office of chief justice was made clear when Buda became the permanent residence of the Tribunal of the Chief Justice. The Act LV of 1514 also emphasized the appointment of secular office-holders. After that the secular and ecclesiastical elite agreed with each other and István Werbőczy, creator of the Tripartitum was appointed later in 1516.

After the battle of Mohács (1526) the reigning chief justice Miklós Thuróczy swore allegiance to Ferdinand I. As a result, the other elected king, John Zápolya also appointed a chief justice for his own royal court in the person of Benedek Bekényi.

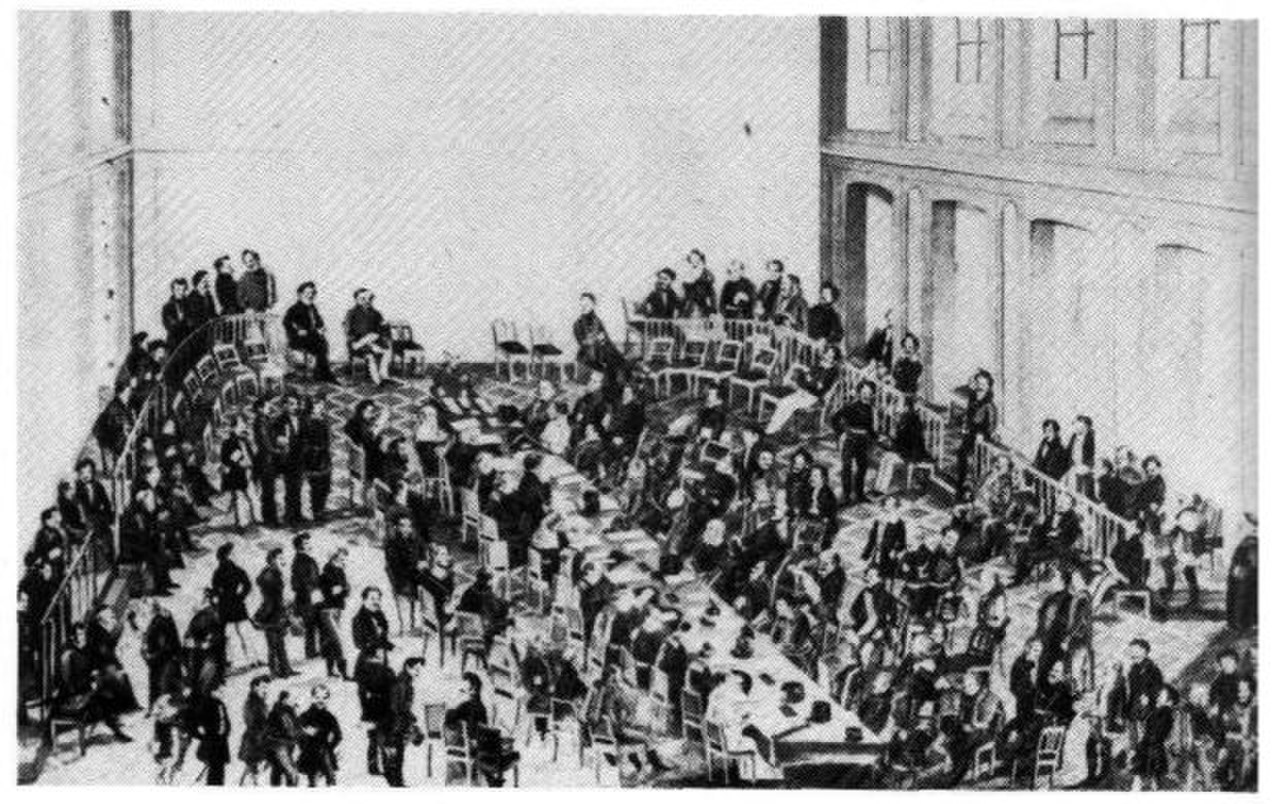
Diet of Hungary (1830)

Charles III divided the Curia Regia into two courts in 1723: the Tabula Septemviralis (Court of the seven) and the Tabula Regia Iudiciaria (Royal Court of Justice). The latter functioned under the direction of the chief justice, in the case of prevention, of the elder Baron Court. The Tabula Regia Iudiciaria was constituted of two prelates, two Barons of the Court, two deputy judge advocates of the Kingdom: the vice Palatine, the deputy judge advocate of the Curia Regia, four prothonotaries, four assessors of the Kingdom, four assessors of the archdiocese, four adjunctive assessors.

The chief justice also had a political function: he became speaker of the occasionally convened lower house of the Diet of Hungary. During the Habsburg-dominated kingdom a customary law emerged whereby jurists to the office of chief justice were chosen from the lesser nobility, however later sometimes aristocrats were also appointed to that position. The Tribunal of the Chief Justice was one of the positions used for the development, patronage and rise of a new aristocracy which was loyal to the House of Habsburg. For the new "official nobility" the position of chief justice was the springboard to obtain higher positions (mostly judge royal, president of the Hungarian Court Chamber, vice-chancellor).

János Zarka opened and presided over the last feudal Diet of 1848. During the Hungarian Revolution of 1848 the position became vacant. After the defeat of the War of Independence Francis Joseph I applied neo-absolutist governance ("Bach system") and integrated the Kingdom of Hungary to the Habsburg Empire. Due to the fall of the Bach system in 1861, the position of chief justice, among others, was revived again and István Melczer took the office. According to the Austro-Hungarian Compromise of 1867 the judicial system had been converted and modernized; the chief justice lost all of its features and the position was officially discontinued.

== List of known chief justices ==
=== Kingdom of Hungary (1000–1538) ===
Term	Portrait	Incumbent	Monarch	Notes	Source
1458		Janus Pannonius (John Csezmicei)	Matthias Corvinus	humanist poet; later bishop of Pécs (1459–1472)	
1458–1459		Albert Vetési	Matthias Corvinus	from the gens Kaplon; also vice-chancellor (1458), secret chancellor (1458–1459), bishop of Veszprém (1458–1486)	
1459–1464		Nicholas Bodó	Matthias Corvinus	personalis presentia	
1464–1465		Albert Hangácsi	Matthias Corvinus	1464 judicial and administrative reform; also bishop of Csanád (1457–1466)	
1465–1466		Stephen	Matthias Corvinus	first term; provost of Kalocsa	
1468–1470		Gabriel Matucsinai	Matthias Corvinus	also vice-chancellor (1468–1471), later archbishop of Kalocsa and lord chancellor (1471–1478)	
1470–1472		Stephen	Matthias Corvinus	second term	
1472–1483		Ladislaus Karai	Matthias Corvinus	provost of Buda; also vice-chancellor (1471–1476); patron of András Hess (Chronica Hungarorum); resigned due to illness	
1483–1484		Peter Váradi	Matthias Corvinus	also lord and secret chancellor (1480–1484), archbishop of Kalocsa (1480–1501); imprisoned	
1485–1486		Lucas Apáti	Matthias Corvinus	provost of Eger	
1486		John Filipec	Matthias Corvinus	Czech: Jan Filipec z Prostějova; also bishop of Olomouc (1484–1490)	
1486–1490		Thomas Drági	Matthias Corvinus	first secular chief justice; Drági Compendium	
1490–1494		Stephanus Crispus (Stephen Fodor)	Vladislaus II	nephew of Urban Nagylucsei; also bishop of Syrmia (1490–1494)	
1495–1501		Domokos Kálmáncsehi	Vladislaus II	also bishop of Várad (1495–1501); Breviarium (1481)	
1502–1503		Lucas Szegedi	Vladislaus II	bishop of Bosnia (1490–1493), treasurer (1490–1492), bishop of Zagreb (1500–1510)	
1503–1512		István Erdődy	Vladislaus II	brother of Tamás Bakócz; remained in office despite Act IV of 1507; also bishop of Syrmia (1503–1505) and bishop of Nyitra (1505–1512)	
1513–1514		János Erdődy	Vladislaus II	nephew of Tamás Bakócz; appointed despite Act IV of 1507; also bishop of Zagreb (1512–1518); resigned	
1516–1525		István Werbőczy	Louis II	creator of the Tripartitum (1514); later palatine (1525–1526), chancellor for John I (1526–1540)	
1525–1527		Miklós Thuróczy	Louis II; Ferdinand I John I	also master of judgement for judge royal (1525–1527); he supported Ferdinand I after the battle of Mohács (1526)	

==== Hungarian Civil War (1526–1538) ====
===== For Ferdinand I =====
Term	Portrait	Incumbent	Notes	Source
1527		Pál Várdai	also archbishop of Esztergom and lord chancellor (1526–1549), later royal governor (1542–1549)	
1527–1542		Ferenc Révay	also ispán of Turóc County (1532–1553), later palatinal governor (1542–1553)	

===== For John I =====
Term	Portrait	Incumbent	Notes	Source
1526–1537		Benedek Bekényi	or Bekény; appointed after the battle of Mohács	
1539		Szaniszló Várallyai	later bishop of Pécs and ispán of Baranya County (1541–1548); the Ottomans occupied Pécs and Baranya during his reign (1543)	

=== Kingdom of Hungary (1538–1867) ===
==== 16th–17th century ====
Term	Portrait	Incumbent	Monarch	Notes	Source
1542–1544	Vacancy				
1544–1562		Mihály Mérey	Ferdinand I	later palatinal governor (1562–1572); creator of the Quadripartitum (1551)	
1562–1570		János Zomor	Ferdinand I Maximilian		
1570–1571		Damján Aranyáni	Maximilian		
1572–1585		András Vitál	Maximilian; Rudolf	master of judgement for palatine (1569–1572)	
1585–1587	Vacancy				
1587–1603		János Joó	Rudolf	dismissed due to his involvement in the show trial against István Illésházy (1603)	
1604–1616		János Lippay	Rudolf; Matthias II	one of the signatories of the treaty of Vienna (1606)	
1617–1625		Benedek Pákay	Matthias II; Ferdinand II	also a royal councillor (1625)	
1625–1627		Mózes Cziráky	Ferdinand II		
1627–1628		István Patachich	Ferdinand II	also acting ban of Croatia (1626–1627)	
1629–1630		Gáspár Tersztyánszky	Ferdinand II		
1631–1649		Tamás Mikulich	Ferdinand II; Ferdinand III		
1650–1665		György Orossy	Ferdinand III; Leopold I	also a royal councillor (1650–1665)	
1665–1666		Gáspár Heölgyi	Leopold I	converted to Roman Catholicism; his widow later married chief justice Esterházy	
1666–1667		János Szakmárdy	Leopold I	also master of judgement for Croatia, Slavonia and Dalmatia, vice-ispán of Varaždin County, royal councillor (1666–1667)	
1667–1670		Farkas Esterházy	Leopold I	from the House of Esterházy; member of the committee which investigated the Wesselényi conspiracy (1670)	
1670–1677		János Majthényi	Leopold I		
1677–1679	Vacancy				
1679–1693		István Orbán	Leopold I	also member of the Gubernium (1681–1693)	
1693–1699		János Maholányi	Leopold I	also master of judgement for chief justice (1695–1699)	

==== 18th–19th century ====
Term	Portrait	Incumbent	Monarch	Notes	Source
1699–1705		Ferenc Klobusiczky	Leopold I	also ispán of Arad (1699–1702) and Sáros Counties (1701–1708); he joined Kuruc during the Rákóczi's War of Independence (1705)	
1705–1707		Leopold Karl von Kollonitsch	Joseph I	also archbishop of Esztergom and lord chancellor (1695–1707); leading figure of the Hungarian Counter-Reformation	
1708–1723		János Horváth-Simonchich	Joseph I Charles III		
1723		László Hunyady	Charles III	also titular counselor for chancellery (1722–1723); died before taking office	
1724–1731		György Száraz	Charles III		
1731–1748		Antal Grassalkovich	Charles III; Maria Theresa	confidant of Maria Theresa; also ispán of Arad County (1744–1751); created baron (1736) and count (1743); appointed president of the Hungarian Court Chamber (1748)	
1748–1762		György Fekete	Maria Theresa	also ispán of Arad and Zaránd Counties (1751–1788); created count (1758); appointed vice-chancellor (1762), later judge royal (1773)	
1762–1765		Ferenc Koller	Maria Theresa	also ispán of Bars County (1759–1787); dismissed	
1765–1779		Jakab Szvetics	Maria Theresa		
1779–1789		Péter Végh	Maria Theresa; Joseph II	also ispán of Baranya County (1782–1792); appointed master of the treasury (1789), later judge royal (1795)	
1789–1795		József Ürményi	Joseph II; Leopold II; Francis	also ispán of Bács County (1790–1802); later appointed governor of Galicia (1801), judge royal (1806); Ratio Educationis (1777)	
1795–1801		József Felsőbüki Nagy	Francis	speaker of the Diet of 1796	
1802–1808		András Semsey	Francis	also ispán of Ugocsa (1803–1807) and Abaúj Counties (1807–1814); appointed president of the Hungarian Court Chamber (1808)	
1808		István Aczél	Francis	dismissed due to heavy resistance against his operation; appointed vice-chancellor (1808)	
1808–1821		György Majláth, Sr.	Francis	Jesuit cleric (1767–1773); also ispán of Tolna County (1811–1821)	
1821–1825		Zsigmond Szőgyény	Francis	father of László Szőgyény-Marich, Sr.; appointed vice-chancellor (1825)	
1825–1831		György Majláth, Jr.	Francis	son of György Majláth, Sr.; also ispán of Hont County (1828–1843), later judge royal (1839–1848), speaker of the House of Magnates and royal governor (1848)	
1831–1833		Sándor Mérey	Francis	also ispán of Somogy County (1831–1845)	
1833–1839		Pongrác Somssich	Francis; Ferdinand V	also ispán of Baranya County (1835–1846)	
1839–1847		István Szerencsy	Ferdinand V	also ispán of Arad County (1836–1842); appointed master of the cupbearers (1847)	
1847–1848		János Zarka	Ferdinand V	speaker of the Diet of 1848	
1848–1861	Vacancy during the Hungarian Revolution of 1848 and after its suppression				
1861–1867		István Melczer	Francis Joseph I	last chief justice of the Kingdom of Hungary	

== See also ==
- Judge royal
- Curia Regia
