= Pozořice =

- Market town
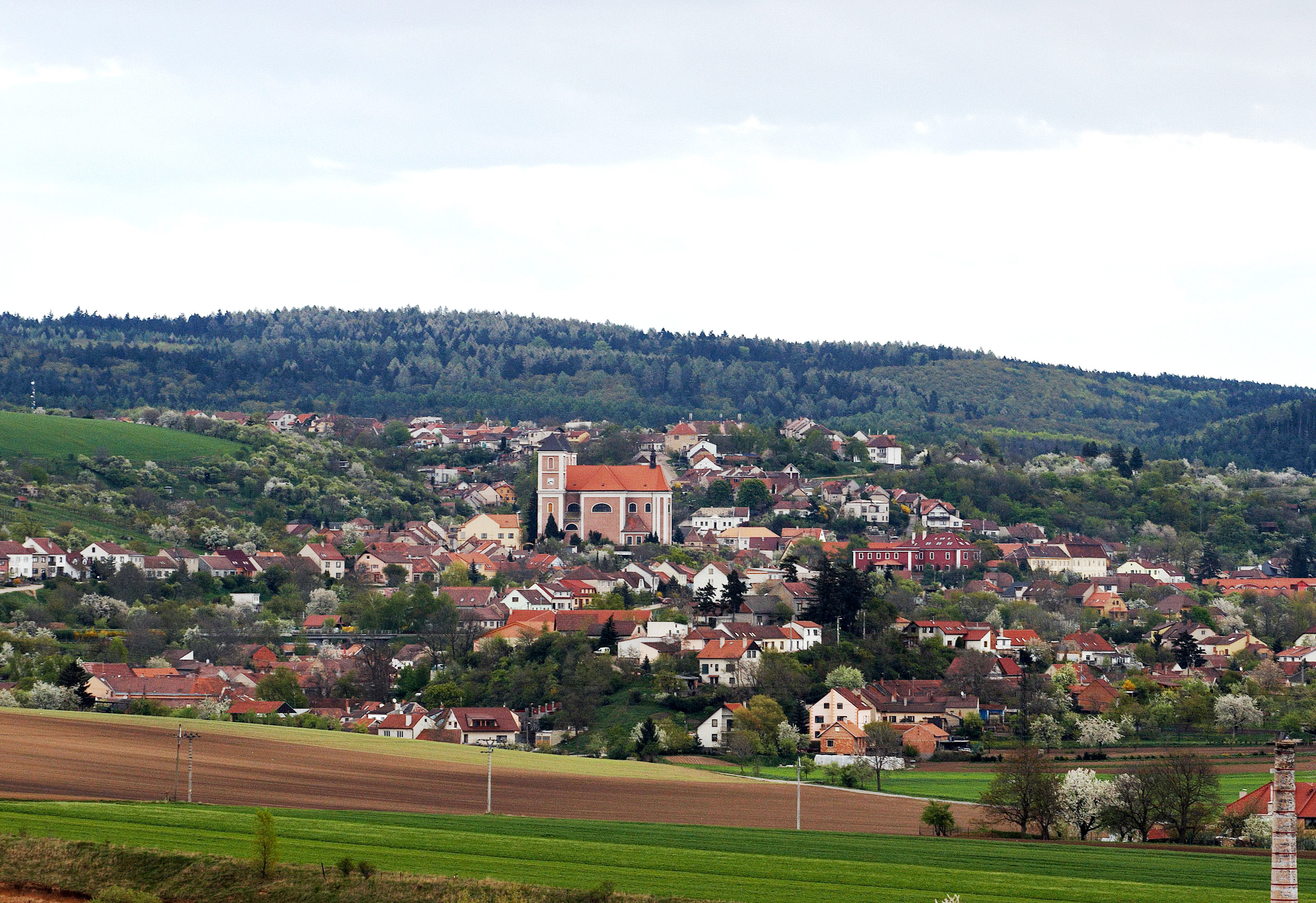
- General view

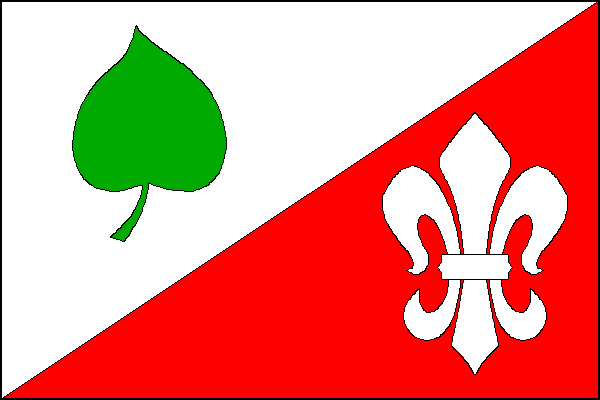
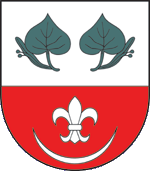
- Flag Coat of arms

- Location in the Czech Republic
- Coordinates: 49°12′35″N 16°47′27″E
- Country: Czech Republic
- Region: South Moravian
- District: Brno-Country
- First mentioned: 1318

Area
  - Total: 15.49 km^{2} (5.98 sq mi)
- Elevation: 365 m (1,198 ft)

Population (2026-01-01)
  - Total: 2,424
  - Density: 156.5/km^{2} (405.3/sq mi)
- Time zone: UTC+1 (CET)
  - Summer (DST): UTC+2 (CEST)
- Postal code: 664 07
- Website: pozorice.cz

Pozořice (Czech pronunciation: [ˈpozor̝ɪtsɛ]) is a market town in Brno-Country District in the South Moravian Region of the Czech Republic. It has about 2,400 inhabitants.

== Geography ==
Pozořice is located about 10 kilometres (6 mi) east of Brno. It lies mostly in the Drahany Highlands, only the southern part of the municipal territory lies in the Dyje–Svratka Valley. The highest point is at 533 m (1,749 ft) above sea level.

== History ==
The first written mention of Pozořice is in a deed of Pope John XXII from 1318. It belonged to the Vildenberk estate, owned by Lords of Vildenberk. In 1371, they sold the estate to Jobst of Moravia. In 1402, when the Vildenberk Castle was already abandoned, Petr of Kravaře bought Pozořice. Lords of Kravaře sold Pozořice to Boček of Otaslavice in 1444 and then the owners often changed, which lasted until 1637. From 1637 to 1920, Pozořice was a property of the Liechtenstein family.

== Demographics ==
Historical population

Year	Pop.	±%
1869	1,292	—
1880	1,370	+6.0%
1890	1,489	+8.7%
1900	1,573	+5.6%
1910	1,704	+8.3%

Year	Pop.	±%
1921	1,691	−0.8%
1930	1,870	+10.6%
1950	1,882	+0.6%
1961	2,093	+11.2%
1970	1,980	−5.4%

Year	Pop.	±%
1980	1,963	−0.9%
1991	1,888	−3.8%
2001	1,976	+4.7%
2011	2,176	+10.1%
2021	2,279	+4.7%

Source: Censuses

== Transport ==
There are no railways or major roads passing through the municipality.

== Sights ==
The main landmark of Pozořice is the Church of the Assumption of the Virgin Mary. It was built in the Baroque style in 1704–1724. It is a massive building that was not completed compared to the architectural plans.

== Twin towns – sister cities ==
Pozořice is twinned with:

- Ivanka pri Dunaji, Slovakia
