= Lőrinc Wathay =

Lőrinc Wathay (? - 1573) was a Hungarian nobleman and castellan of Csesznek.

He served as a military officer in Kassa and Transylvania and after Bálint Török was captured by the Ottomans, King Ferdinand I appointed him castellan of Csesznek. Wathay fortified the castle and strengthened the guard, thus he was able to repel the Turkish siege in 1561.

He died in an accident in 1573, when an old cannon exploded in the castle.

His wife was Klára Csabi, and their son Ferenc Wathay was also a famous commander and author of the Songbook of Ferenc Wathay.

== Sources ==
- The statue of Lőrinc Wathay
- History of Csesznek
- Geocaching: Csesznek
- Bethlen Gábor Hagyományőrség
