= John Filipec =

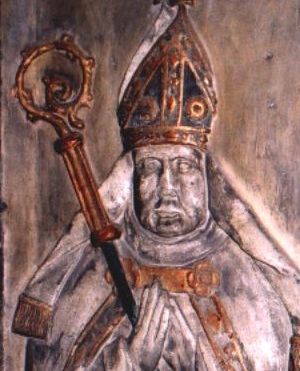
- Tombstone of Filipec
- Native name: Jan Filipec z Prostějova
- Church: Catholic Church
- Diocese: Várad (Oradea)
- Installed: 1476
- Term ended: 1490
- Other post(s): Olomouc

Personal details
- Born: 1431; Prostějov
- Died: 28 June 1509 (aged 77–78); Uherské Hradiště

John Filipec (Czech: Jan Filipec z Prostějova, Hungarian: Pruisz Filipec János; according to the official list of bishops of Oradea/Várad:Johannes IX. Filipecz de Prosznicz; 1431 – 28 June 1509) was an advisor of the kings Matthias Corvinus and Vladislaus II of Bohemia and Hungary. From 1476 to 1490, he was bishop of Várad; from 1484 to 1490, he was also administrator of Olomouc. From 1480 to 1481, he was Landeshauptmann of Silesia. In 1492, he joined the Franciscan order.

== Life ==
John Filipec was born in Prostějov and brought up in a humble utraquist family. After attending school in Prostějov, he became clerk of the Moravian governor in Olomouc. In this position, he met king Matthias Corvinus, when the latter took possession of Olomouc. Matthias recommended John as secretary to the Voivode of Transylvania. As a companion of the voivode, John then recommended the election of Matthias as king to the Estates of Bohemia. This was perhaps the reason why Matthias appointed John as his advisor and negotiator in 1472 and as Governor of Silesia in 1480. Filipec served as chief justice for a short time in 1486.

=== Bishop of Várad ===
Although John had not been ordained as a priest, Matthias Corvinus obtained a dispensation from Pope Sixtus IV, allowing him to appoint John as bishop of Várad in 1476. John was consecrated as bishop on 23 May 1477. After his appointment as bishop, John still worked for Matthias, who appointed him as Chancellor in 1478. Later that year, John tried to reconcile between Matthias and the Utraquist Estates. In 1480, he mediated in a conflict between King Vladislaus II of Bohemia and the Utraquist citizens of Prague. In 1481, Matthias appointed him governor of the Duchy of Jawor.

=== Administrator of Olomouc ===
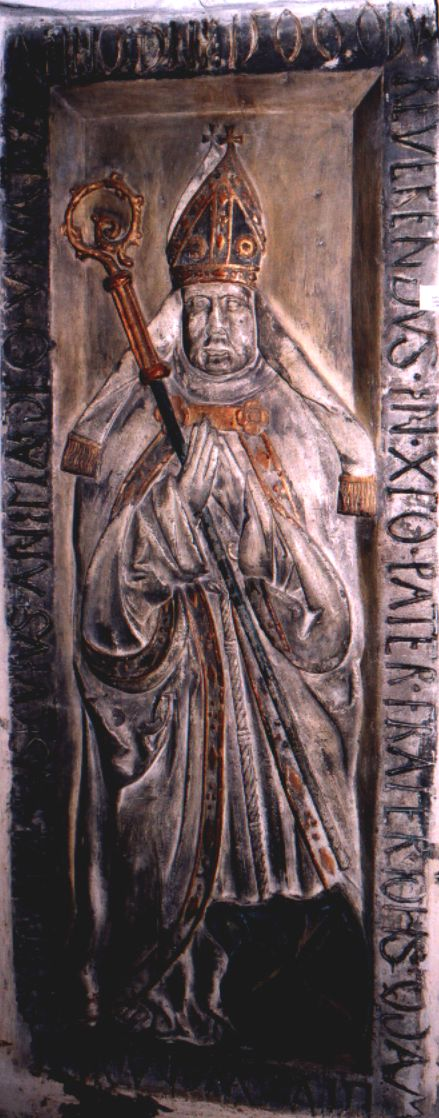
Tombstone of John Filipec

After the death of bishop Protasius of Olomouc in 1482, the cathedral chapter could not agree on the election of a successor. Normally King Matthias, as ruler of Moravia, would appoint the candidate proposed by the chapter. In the absence of a bishop, the diocese was administered by the canon (priest)s Johann Pauswangel, Alex von Iglau and Heinrich von Zwole. In 1484, the chapel elected, at the request of the King, John as a permanent administrator.

As administrator, John introduced economic measures to counter the destruction brought about by the Hussite Wars. He improved the administration, and repaid the mortgages on several properties and the episcopal town of Mohelnice. He restored the Cathedral of Olomouc and other episcopal buildings and expanded the castles at Vyškov and Mírov. He promoted humanism in Moravia by founding a printing company in Brno, which published important humanistic works.

John was accused of advocacy for the utraquist case and Pope Innocent VIII ordered an investigation by the papal nuncio in Buda. John was relieved of his duties as administrator of Olomouc and Bishop János Vitéz of Sirmium (a nephew of Archbishop János Vitéz of Esztergom) was appointed as the new administrator. However, János Vitéz never travelled to Olomouc to take possession of his new diocese. On 26 August 1488, John requested permission to resign as administrator and enter a monastery. The pope gave his permission on 3 June 1489 and appointed Ardicino della Porta as the new administrator. However, King Matthias rejected the request and Ardicino never went to Olomouc. King Matthias died and was succeeded by King Vladislaus II, who gave John on 21 September 1490 permission to resign, on the condition that he would continue to act as royal advisor and diplomat.

In 1491, John founded a Franciscan monastery in Uherské Hradiště. In 1492, he founded another one in Jawor in Silesia. In the same year, he initiated the move of the Augustinian All Saints' monastery from Lanškroun to Olomouc.

=== Franciscan friar ===
In 1493, John brought his financial affairs in order and on 20 May 1492, he joined the Order of Friars Minor in Olomouc. He took his vows on 10 June in Wrocław. From 1492 to 1500, he lived in the monastery of Jawor. He then moved to Olomouc and finally to Uherské Hradiště. Even as a friar, he acted as a royal advisor until his death. In 1494, he took part in the negotiations with the utraquists in Prague about the reinstatement of the Catholic church. In 1508, he negotiated the resolution of a conflict between the Bohemian estates. He died in Uherské Hradiště.

John Filipec Born: 1431 Died: 28 June 1509
Catholic Church titles
Preceded by Nicolas II Stolcz de Slantz	Bishop of Várad; 1477–1490	Succeeded by Valentin Farkas Vlk
Preceded by Protasius	Bishop of Olomouc; 1484–1490	Succeeded by Ardicino della Porta
Political offices
Preceded by Lucas Apáti	Chief justice 1486	Succeeded by Thomas Drági
