= Farkas Esterházy =

Hungarian noble

- Baron of Galántha
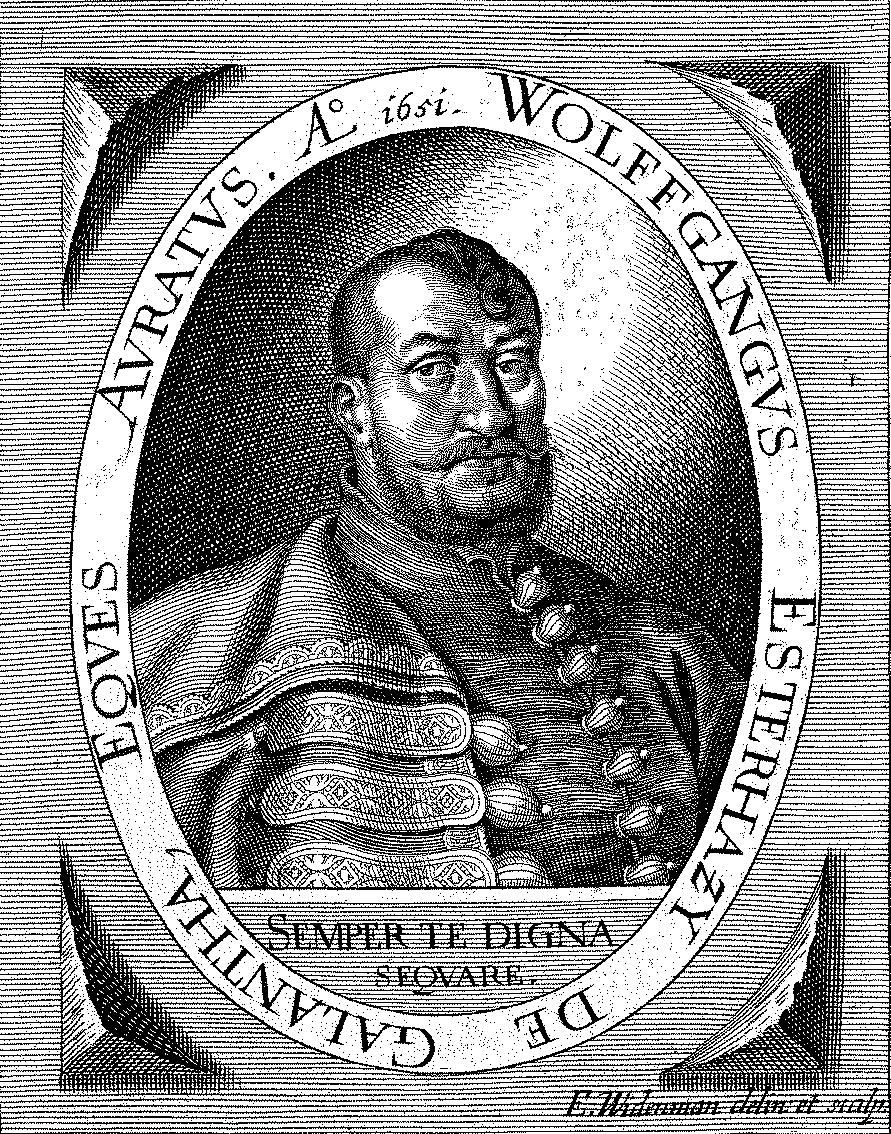

Chief Justice
- Reign: 1 June 1667 – 2 September 1670
- Predecessor: János Szakmárdy de Diankovec
- Successor: Baron János Majthényi de Kesselőkeő
- Full name: Baron Farkas Esterházy de Galántha
- Born: 1614
- Died: 2 September 1670 (aged 55–56); Lőcse, Kingdom of Hungary (today: Levoča, Slovakia)
- Noble family: Esterházy
- Spouse: Anna Boka de Ocsova (c. 1668)
- Father: Baron Gábor Esterházy de Galántha
- Mother: Anna Ujfalussy de Divékujfalu

Baron Farkas Esterházy de Galántha (1614 – 2 September 1670) was a Hungarian noble from the House of Esterházy, son of royal councillor Baron Gábor Esterházy and his first wife, Anna Ujfalussy de Divékujfalu. Farkas served as Chief Justice (Latin: personalis, Hungarian: személynök) of Hungary between 1 June 1667 and 2 September 1670.

== Life ==
Farkas baptized on 7 May 1615 at Domanisz (today: Domaniža, Slovakia; Hungarian: Demény). He early orphaned by the death of his parents. He grown up his uncle, Nikolaus, Count Esterházy's court. He studied in the Jesuit College at Vienna during the first half of the 1630s. He also acquired legal knowledge in the Imperial City. He moved to Rome in 1644. He served as commander of the Sempte Castle (today: Šintava, Slovakia) from 1644 to 1645. After that he lived in Forchtenstein/Fraknó and Eisenstadt/Kismarton.

He became a Knight of the Order of the Golden Spur in 1647. He was also elected to the Royal Council. He oversaw the education of his uncle's orphans after 1645. He was a member of several commissions during the Diets of 1655 and 1662. He served as Chief Justice until his death. In 1670, Lőcse, he was a member of the committee presided by Count Rothal which conducted an investigation against the participants of the Wesselényi conspiracy. He presumably died of dysentery.

== Family ==
Esterházy married to Anna Boka de Ovocsa, the widow of a former Chief Justice Gáspár Heölgyi around 1668. They had no children.

== Sources ==
- Markó, László: A magyar állam főméltóságai Szent Istvántól napjainkig – Életrajzi Lexikon p. 337. (The High Officers of the Hungarian State from Saint Stephen to the Present Days – A Biographical Encyclopedia) (2nd edition); Helikon Kiadó Kft., 2006, Budapest; ISBN 963-547-085-1.

Farkas II House of Esterházy Born: 1614 Died: 2 September 1670
Political offices
Preceded by János Szakmárdy	Chief justice 1667–1670	Succeeded by János Majthényi
