= Benedek Eszterhas =

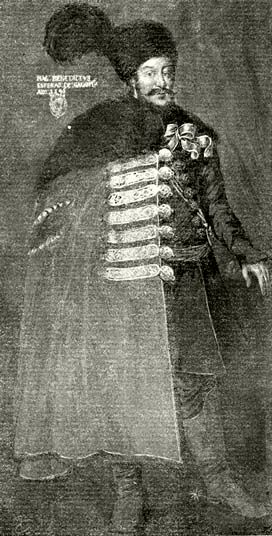
- based on the original painting by Károly Csernai
- Full name: Benedek Zerhas de Zerhashaz
- Born: 1508
- Died: before 25 August 1553
- Noble family: House of Esterházy
- Spouse: Ilona Bessenyei de Galántha
- Issue: five, including: Ferenc
- Father: Márton Zerhas de Zerhashaz
- Mother: Erzsébet Wad de Felszász

Benedek Eszterhas (born as Benedek Zerhas de Zerhashaz; 1508 – before 25 August 1553) was a Hungarian noble from the kindred of Salamon, son of Márton Zerhas de Zerhashaz and his second wife Erzsébet Wad de Felszász. He had five siblings.

Benedek was the first who used the "Eszterhas" (later Esterházy) surname. He married Ilona Bessenyei de Galántha. They had five children, including Ferenc, the ancestor and founder of the House of Esterházy. Later, Ferenc inherited the lordship of Galánta (today: Galanta, Slovakia) from his mother.

== Children ==
- Ferenc (1533–1604), married Zsófia Illésházy de Illésháza in 1566
- István (c. 1535 – c. 1573)
- Anna (c. 1534 – after 1560), married three times:
  - Ferenc Dely de Thoma, killed in the Siege of Temesvár (1552)
  - Balázs Hegyi de Kosuth
  - Balázs Thewrek de Garamszentbenedek (marriage around 1557)
- Magdolna, married twice:
  - Ambrus Hegyi de Kosuth (died 1553)
  - Ferenc More de Balázs-Ethe
- Margit, married Gábor Polyák de Apcz et Regy
