= Ivanka pri Dunaji =

Ivanka pri Dunaji Pozsonyivánka
- Municipality
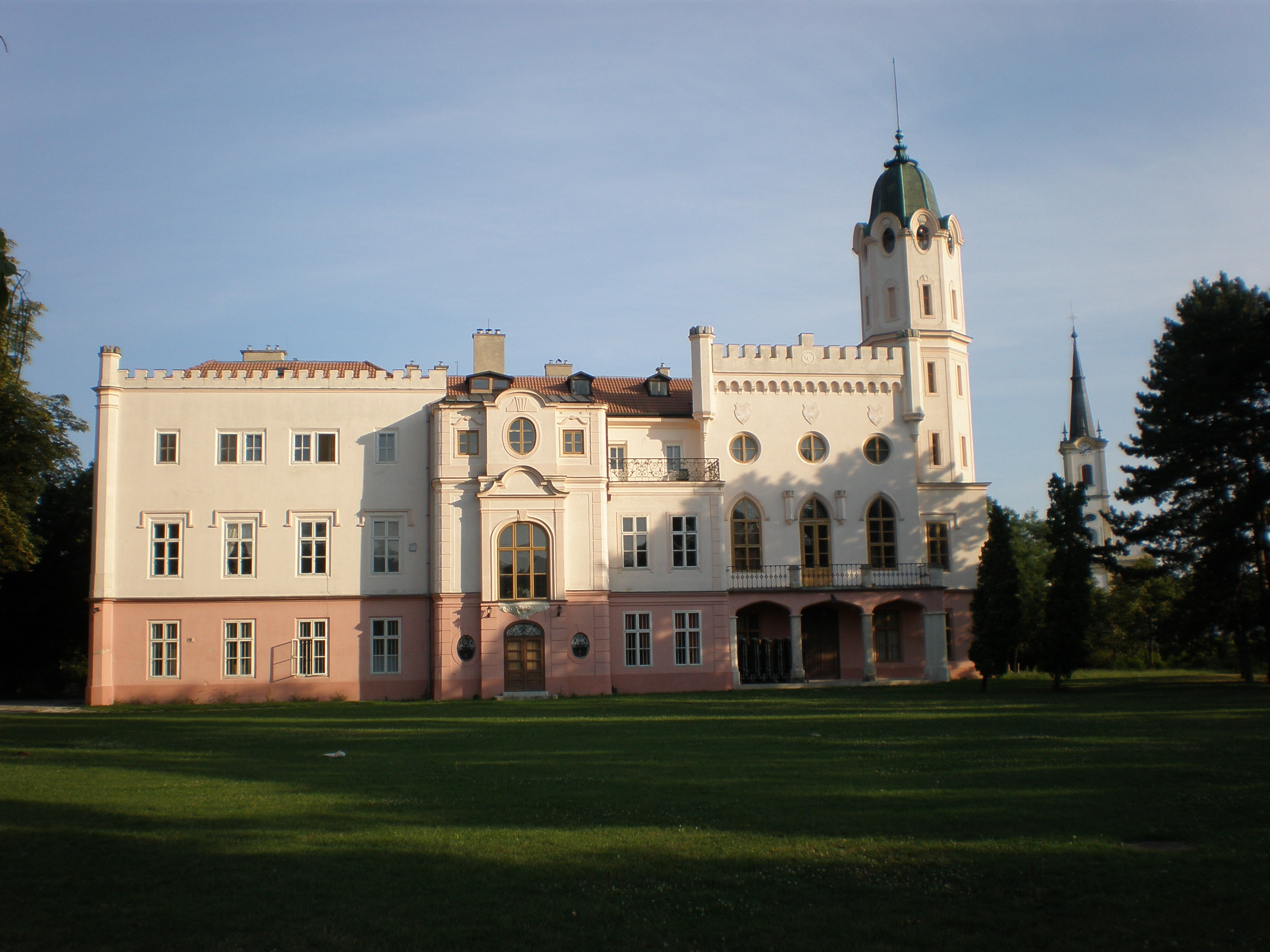
- Castle and church in the village

- Flag Coat of arms

- Location of Ivanka pri Dunaji in the Bratislava Region Location of Ivanka pri Dunaji in Slovakia
- Coordinates: 48.19°N 17.26°E
- Country: Slovakia
- Region: Bratislava Region
- District: Senec District
- First mentioned: 1209

Government
  - Mayor: Vladimír Letenay

Area
  - Total: 14.25 km^{2} (5.50 sq mi)
- Elevation: 132 m (433 ft)

Population (2025)
  - Total: 7,274
- Time zone: UTC+1 (CET)
  - Summer (DST): UTC+2 (CEST)
- Postal code: 900 28
- Area code: +421 14
- Vehicle registration plate (until 2022): SC
- Website: www.ivankapridunaji.sk

Ivanka pri Dunaji (Hungarian: Pozsonyivánka) is a village and municipality in western Slovakia in Senec District in the Bratislava Region.

== History ==
In historical records the village was first mentioned in 1209.

In the centre of the village is a large rococo style house, built in the third quarter of the 18th century. It was altered at the beginning of the 20th century, by order of the Hunyadi family. The building has a combination of romanesque and gothic elements on its facade, including oriels, balconies, windows, and a polygonal tower with an Art Nouveau style top. The house was originally surrounded by an extensive French-style park.

In 1919, near Ivanka pri Dunaji, a plane carrying Milan Rastislav Štefánik—a prominent Slovak politician, diplomat, and astronomer—crashed, resulting in his death. The incident is remembered as a significant historical event in the area.

== Geography ==
The municipality lies at an altitude of 132 metres (433 ft) and covers an area of 14.25 km^{2} (5.50 sq mi) (2025).

== Population ==
Population statistic (10 years)
Year	1995	2005	2015	2025
Count	4573	5541	6384	7274
Difference		+21.16%	+15.21%	+13.94%

Population statistic
Year	2024	2025
Count	7247	7274
Difference		+0.37%

It has a population of 7274 people (31 December 2025).

=== Ethnicity ===
Census 2021 (1+ %)
Ethnicity	Number	Fraction
Slovak	6257	89.75%
Not found out	522	7.48%
Czech	100	1.43%
Hungarian	79	1.13%
Total	6971	

In year 2021 was 6971 people by ethnicity 6257 as Slovak, 522 as Not found out, 100 as Czech, 79 as Hungarian, 43 as Vietnamese, 38 as Other, 26 as Ukrainian, 22 as Rusyn, 21 as German, 14 as Russian, 10 as Chinese, 9 as Jewish, 8 as Serbian, 5 as Romanian, 5 as Austrian, 5 as Croatian, 5 as Bulgarian, 3 as Polish, 3 as Canadian, 2 as Romani, 2 as Moravian, 2 as Greek, 2 as English, 1 as Italian and 1 as Albanian.

Note on population: The difference values of population numbers in the table "Population statistic" and in the sections "Ethnicity" & "Religion" is caused by the use of various statistical methods.

=== Religion ===
Census 2021 (1+ %)
Religion	Number	Fraction
Roman Catholic Church	3051	43.77%
None	2795	40.09%
Not found out	535	7.67%
Evangelical Church	250	3.59%
Greek Catholic Church	70	1%
Total	6971	

In year 2021 was 6971 people by religion 3051 from Roman Catholic Church, 2795 from None, 535 from Not found out, 250 from Evangelical Church, 70 from Greek Catholic Church, 44 from Ad hoc movements, 43 from Eastern Orthodox Church, 32 from Buddhism, 28 from Jehovah's Witnesses, 22 from Christian Congregations in Slovakia, 22 from Other, 19 from Calvinist Church, 11 from Jewish community, 9 from Islam, 8 from Other and not ascertained christian church, 6 from Paganism and natural spirituality, 6 from Czechoslovak Hussite Church, 5 from United Methodist Church, 5 from Apostolic Church, 3 from Old Catholic Church, 3 from Hinduism, 3 from Seventh-day Adventist Church and 1 from Church of the Brethren.

== Church of Saint John the Baptist ==
Church of Saint John the Baptist—current church in Ivanka pri Dunaji—is the third church in Ivanka. The first one was built by the followers of Saints Cyril and Methodius. It was a simple church from wood. The second one was repaired in 1730. It was built from stone and wood. The building of today's church began in 1770 and the building of the tower lasted two years. The tower clock was bought from Vienna in 1880. In 1991 the roof was fully replaced.

== Twin towns — sister cities ==
Ivanka pri Dunaji is twinned with:

- Pozořice, Czech Republic

== See also ==
- List of municipalities and towns in Slovakia

== Genealogical resources ==
The records for genealogical research are available at the state archive "Státný archiv in Bratislava, Slovakia"

- Roman Catholic church records (births/marriages/deaths): 1729-1898 (parish A)

== External links/Sources ==
Media related to Ivanka pri Dunaji at Wikimedia Commons

- https://web.archive.org/web/20071027094149/http://www.statistics.sk/mosmis/eng/run.html
- Surnames of living people in Ivanka pri Dunaji
