= Karoline Gräfin Hunyady =

Austrian court official

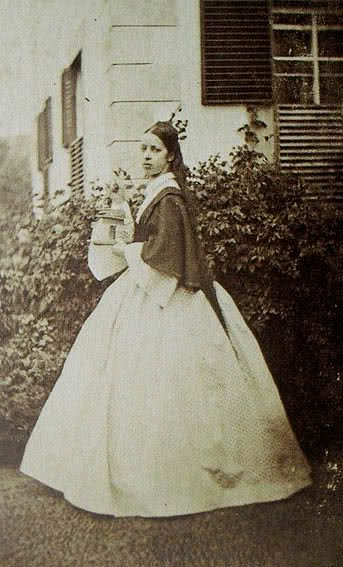
Karoline Gräfin Hunyady

Countess Caroline Hunyady de Kéthely (German: Karoline Gräfin Hunyady von Kéthely, Hungarian: Kéthelyi gróf Hunyady Karolina, born 26 December 1836 in Vienna, Austrian Empire – died 28 February 1907 Vienna, Austria-Hungary), known as Lily Hunyady, belonged to the Hungarian high nobility and was the lady-in-waiting to Empress Elisabeth of Austria-Hungary.

== Biography ==
She was a favorite and confidant of the empress. She was the empress' first Hungarian lady-in-waiting and gave her an enthusiasm for Hungary.
