= Battle of Vezekény =

1652 battle

- Part of the Ottoman wars in Europe and Ottoman-Habsburg wars
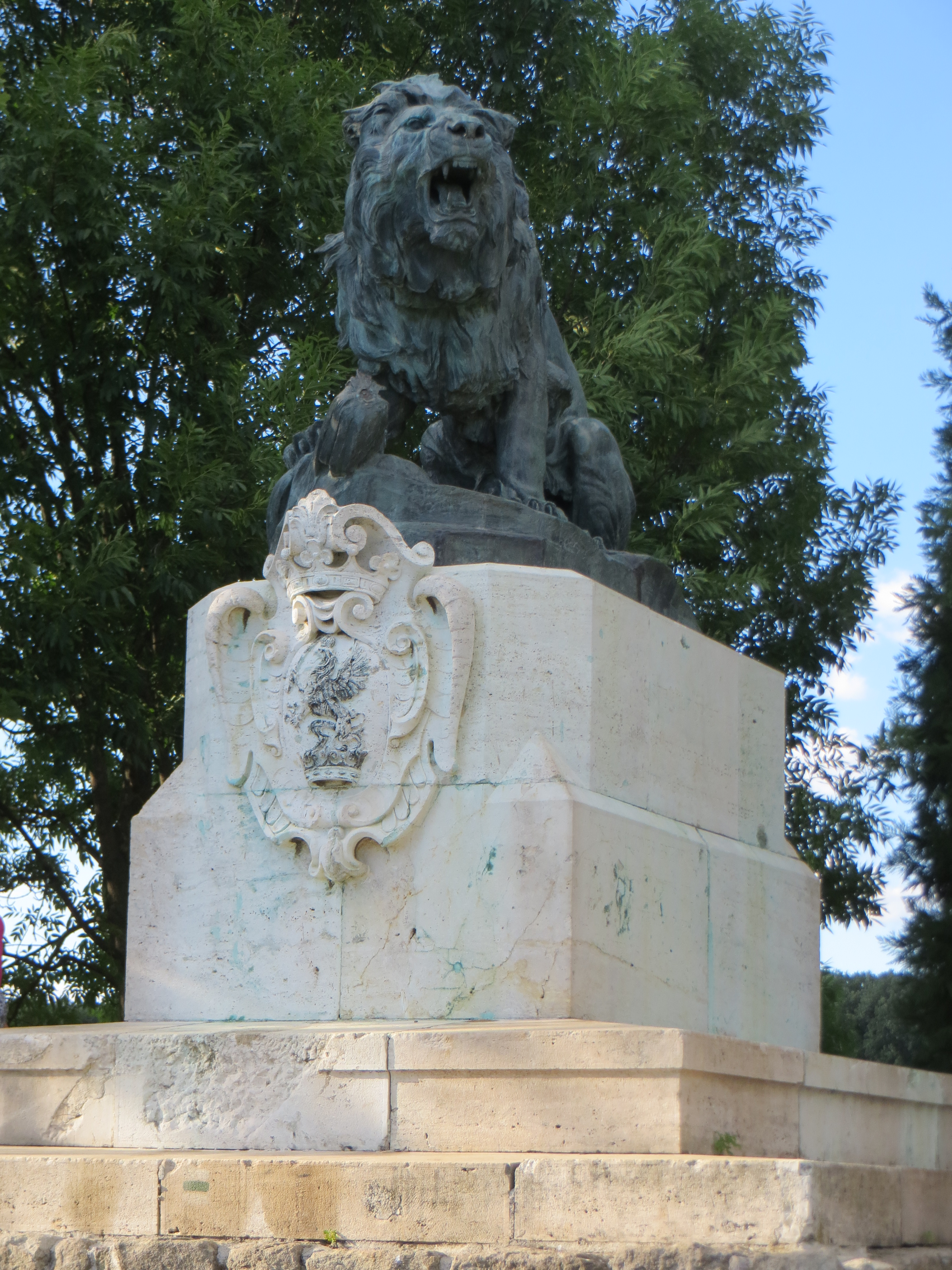
- Monument to the fallen in Veľké Vozokany
Date	25 August 1652
Location	Vezekény, Upper Hungary (present-day Veľké Vozokany, Slovakia)
Result	Hungarian victory

Belligerents
Habsburg Monarchy: Kingdom of Hungary	Ottoman Empire

Commanders and leaders
Ádám Forgách; Ladislaus, Count Esterházy †	Bey Mustafa

Strength
1,200	4,300

The Battle of Vezekény (Hungarian: vezekényi csata) occurred during the 17th century Ottoman Wars in Europe. It was a major Hungarian victory.

Tamás Esterházy was killed in the battle along with his younger brother Gáspár and his cousin László.

== In the library ==
The Battle of Vezekény is written in Slovak fiction:

Šoltés, Tomáš : Kronika odbojov - Anarchia (historical novel, 2019), ISBN 9788057010890
