= István Esterházy (1572–1596) =

Hungarian noble (1572–1596)

- Lord of Galánta
- Full name: István Esterházy de Galánta
- Born: 4 March 1572
- Died: 26 October 1596 (aged 24); Mezőkeresztes, Kingdom of Hungary
- Noble family: Esterházy
- Father: Ferenc Esterházy de Galánta
- Mother: Zsófia Illésházy de Illésháza

István Esterházy de Galánta (4 March 1572 – 26 October 1596) was a Hungarian nobleman and soldier, son of Vice-ispán (Viscount; vicecomes) of Pozsony County Ferenc Esterházy. One of his brothers was Nikolaus, Count Esterházy, who served as Palatine of Hungary.

István participated, along with his father, in the 1596 campaign against the Ottoman Empire. They served in the army under commander Count Miklós Pálffy (1552–1600). István Esterházy was killed in the Battle of Keresztes on 26 October 1596.
