= Tamás Esterházy (1570–1616) =

- Lord of Galántha
- Full name: Tamás Esterházy de Galántha
- Born: 8 May 1570
- Died: 1616 (or 1615); Galántha, Kingdom of Hungary (today: Galanta, Slovakia)
- Noble family: House of Esterházy
- Father: Ferenc Esterházy de Galántha
- Mother: Zsófia Illésházy de Illésháza

Tamás Esterházy de Galántha (8 May 1570 – 1616) was a Hungarian noble, son of Vice-ispán (Viscount; vicecomes) of Pozsony County Ferenc Esterházy. One of his brothers was Nikolaus, Count Esterházy who served as Palatine of Hungary.

He studied at the University of Wittenberg since 3 October 1589 where he converted to Calvinism. He translated one of his teacher, Aegidius Hunnius's works into Hungarian. Cardinal Péter Pázmány, a key member and initiator of the Hungarian counter-Reformation condemned Esterházy's work and called Hunnius' publication as "evil".

Tamás Esterházy died in 1616 at Galántha, ancient estate of the House of Esterházy.

== Works ==
- Az Igaz Aniaszentegyhazrol, es ennec feieről az Christvsrol. Ismeg az Romai Anyaszent egyházról es ennec feieről, az Romai Paprol valo Articulus… Irattatott Aegidius Hunnius, az Szent irasnac Doctora és Professora altal… Sárvár, 1602. (printing was financially supported by István Illésházy, Esterházy's uncle)

== Sources ==
- Szinnyei, József: Magyar írók élete és munkái II. (Caban–Exner). Budapest, Hornyánszky, 1893.
