= Čereňany =

- Municipality
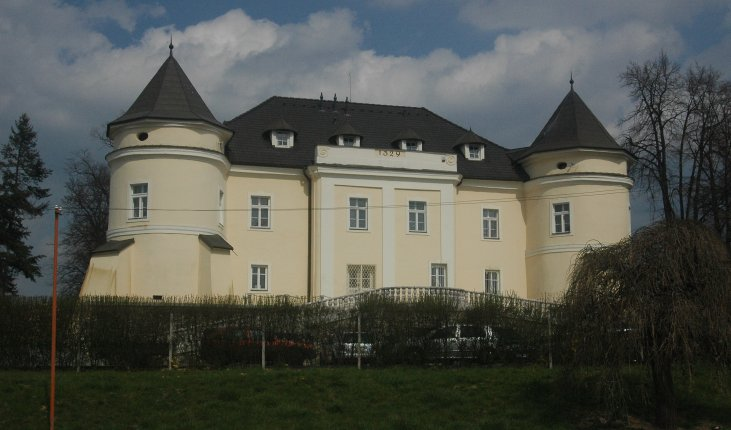

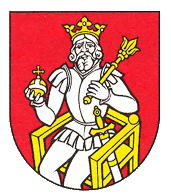
- Flag Coat of arms

- Location of Čereňany in the Trenčín Region Location of Čereňany in Slovakia
- Coordinates: 48.65°N 18.48°E
- Country: Slovakia
- Region: Trenčín Region
- District: Prievidza District
- First mentioned: 1329

Area
  - Total: 18.97 km^{2} (7.32 sq mi)
- Elevation: 258 m (846 ft)

Population (2025)
  - Total: 1,757
- Time zone: UTC+1 (CET)
  - Summer (DST): UTC+2 (CEST)
- Postal code: 972 46
- Area code: +421 46
- Vehicle registration plate (until 2022): PD
- Website: cerenany.sk

Čereňany (Hungarian: Cserenye) is a village and municipality in Prievidza District in the Trenčín Region of western Slovakia.

== History ==
In historical records the village was first mentioned in 1329.

== Geography ==
The municipality lies at an altitude of 258 metres (846 ft) and covers an area of 18.97 km^{2} (7.32 sq mi) (2025).

== Population ==
Population statistic (10 years)
Year	1995	2005	2015	2025
Count	1701	1741	1657	1757
Difference		+2.35%	−4.82%	+6.03%

Population statistic
Year	2024	2025
Count	1742	1757
Difference		+0.86%

It has a population of 1757 people (31 December 2025).

=== Ethnicity ===
Census 2021 (1+ %)
Ethnicity	Number	Fraction
Slovak	1685	96.06%
Not found out	59	3.36%
Total	1754	

In year 2021 was 1754 people by ethnicity 1685 as Slovak, 59 as Not found out, 16 as Czech, 5 as German, 5 as Hungarian, 4 as Other, 2 as Polish, 1 as Ukrainian, 1 as Rusyn, 1 as Russian, 1 as Greek and 1 as Croatian.

Note on population: The difference values of population numbers in the table "Population statistic" and in the sections "Ethnicity" & "Religion" is caused by the use of various statistical methods.

=== Religion ===
Census 2021 (1+ %)
Religion	Number	Fraction
Roman Catholic Church	1355	77.25%
None	286	16.31%
Not found out	65	3.71%
Total	1754	

In year 2021 was 1754 people by religion 1355 from Roman Catholic Church, 286 from None, 65 from Not found out, 16 from Evangelical Church, 6 from Other, 6 from Greek Catholic Church, 6 from Ad hoc movements, 4 from Paganism and natural spirituality, 4 from Christian Congregations in Slovakia, 3 from Other and not ascertained christian church, 2 from Calvinist Church and 1 from Eastern Orthodox Church.

== Genealogical resources ==
The records for genealogical research are available at the state archive "Statny Archiv in Nitra, Slovakia"

- Roman Catholic church records (births/marriages/deaths): 1688-1895 (parish B)
- Lutheran church records (births/marriages/deaths): 1735-1950 (parish B)

== See also ==
- List of municipalities and towns in Slovakia
