= Veľké Vozokany =

Veľké Vozokany Nagyvezekény
- Municipality
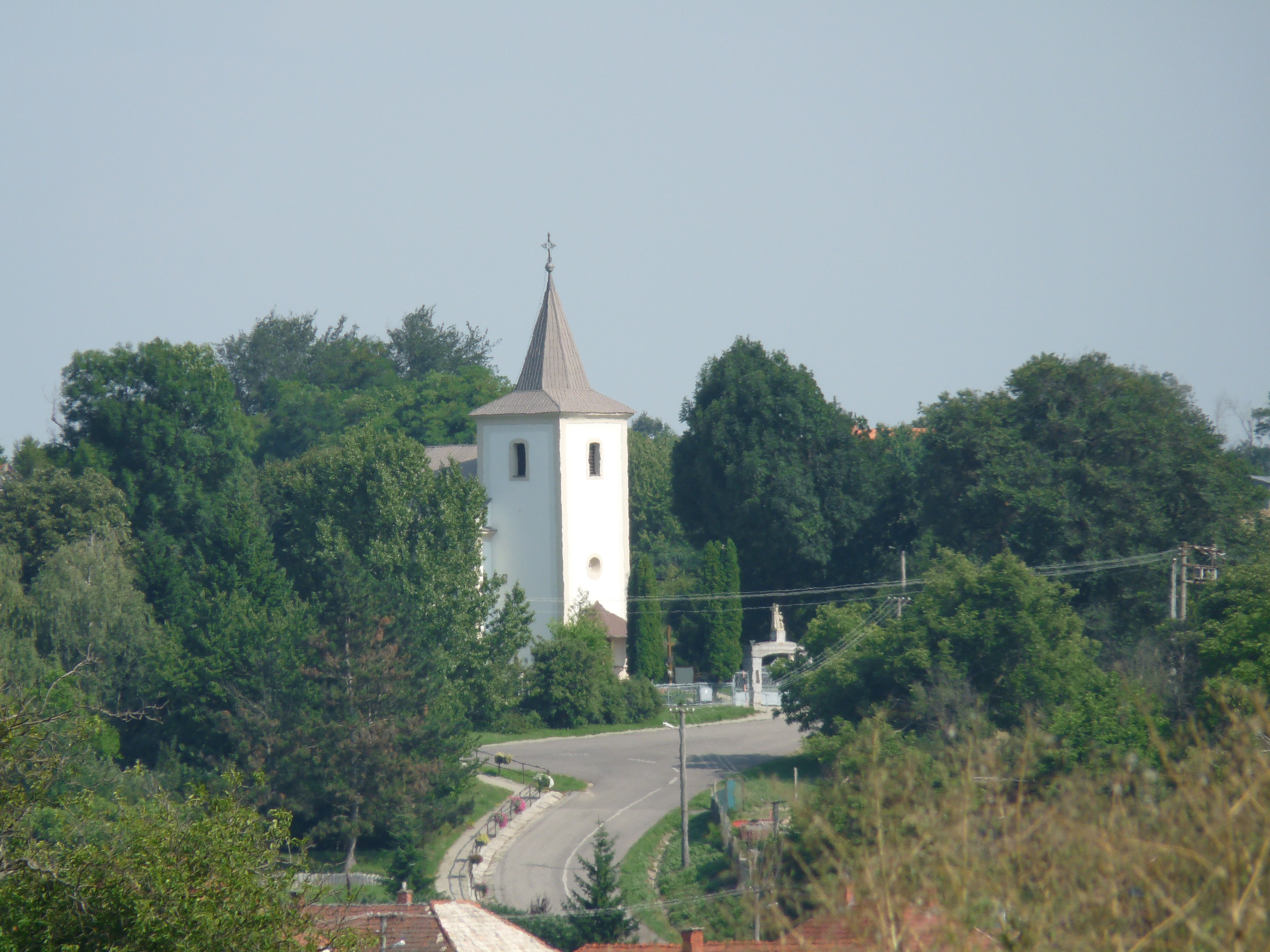

- Flag

- Location of Veľké Vozokany in the Nitra Region Location of Veľké Vozokany in Slovakia
- Coordinates: 48.32°N 18.41°E
- Country: Slovakia
- Region: Nitra Region
- District: Zlaté Moravce District
- First mentioned: 1209

Area
  - Total: 9.87 km^{2} (3.81 sq mi)
- Elevation: 181 m (594 ft)

Population (2025)
  - Total: 419
- Time zone: UTC+1 (CET)
  - Summer (DST): UTC+2 (CEST)
- Postal code: 951 82
- Area code: +421 37
- Vehicle registration plate (until 2022): ZM
- Website: www.velkevozokany.sk

Veľké Vozokany (Hungarian: Nagyvezekény) is a village and municipality in the Zlaté Moravce District of the Nitra Region, in western-central Slovakia.

== History ==
In historical records the village was first mentioned in 1209. The community of Veľké Vozokany is certified to have existed by 1228. The Roman Catholic St. Nicolas Church is originally a Gothic structure that received Baroque modifications in 1742 and was further rebuilt in the 19th century. The whole settlement was once a property of the Abbey of Hronský Beňadik.

On 26 August 1652, one of the most significant battles against the Turks in the region was fought here, at a place called Lech near Starý háj (“Old Grove“). Ádám Forgách, then commander of the fortress of Nové Zámky, bravely led his troops, supported by local people and the garrisons of Vráble and Levice against Turkish troops commanded by Mustafa. Despite outnumbering their enemy almost three times, the Turks suffered a bitter defeat. The four Esterházy brothers were among those killed in battle and they were buried on 26 November 1652, in the crypt of Trnava's University Church. The battlefield was marked by a 5-metre-tall (16 ft) obelisk commemorating the victory and the sacrifice of the four brothers, erected in 1734. In 1896 it was replaced by the memorial we can see today—a white travertine pedestal with a bronze sculpture of a lion crushing a Turkish battle flag. The pedestal bears a Latin inscription that reads: “Hold on, traveller, and read!“. Author is Vojtech Markup.

== Population ==
Population statistic (10 years)
Year	1995	2005	2015	2025
Count	534	497	475	419
Difference		−6.92%	−4.42%	−11.78%

Population statistic
Year	2024	2025
Count	426	419
Difference		−1.64%

It has a population of 419 people (31 December 2025).

=== Ethnicity ===
Census 2021 (1+ %)
Ethnicity	Number	Fraction
Slovak	440	98.21%
Not found out	6	1.33%
Total	448	

In year 2021 was 448 people by ethnicity 440 as Slovak, 6 as Not found out, 4 as Czech, 1 as Jewish, 1 as Ukrainian, 1 as Romani and 1 as Rusyn.

Note on population: The difference values of population numbers in the table "Population statistic" and in the sections "Ethnicity" & "Religion" is caused by the use of various statistical methods.

=== Religion ===
Census 2021 (1+ %)
Religion	Number	Fraction
Roman Catholic Church	375	83.71%
None	55	12.28%
Not found out	5	1.12%
Total	448	

In year 2021 was 448 people by religion 375 from Roman Catholic Church, 55 from None, 5 from Not found out, 4 from Greek Catholic Church, 3 from Ad hoc movements, 2 from Other, 2 from Evangelical Church, 1 from Islam and 1 from Baptists Church.

== Culture ==
In the village is brass music band, singing group Lipa, children singing club Vozokanček and a theater group.

== Geography ==
The municipality lies at an altitude of 181 metres (594 ft) and covers an area of 9.87 km^{2} (3.81 sq mi) (2025).
