= Csesznek =

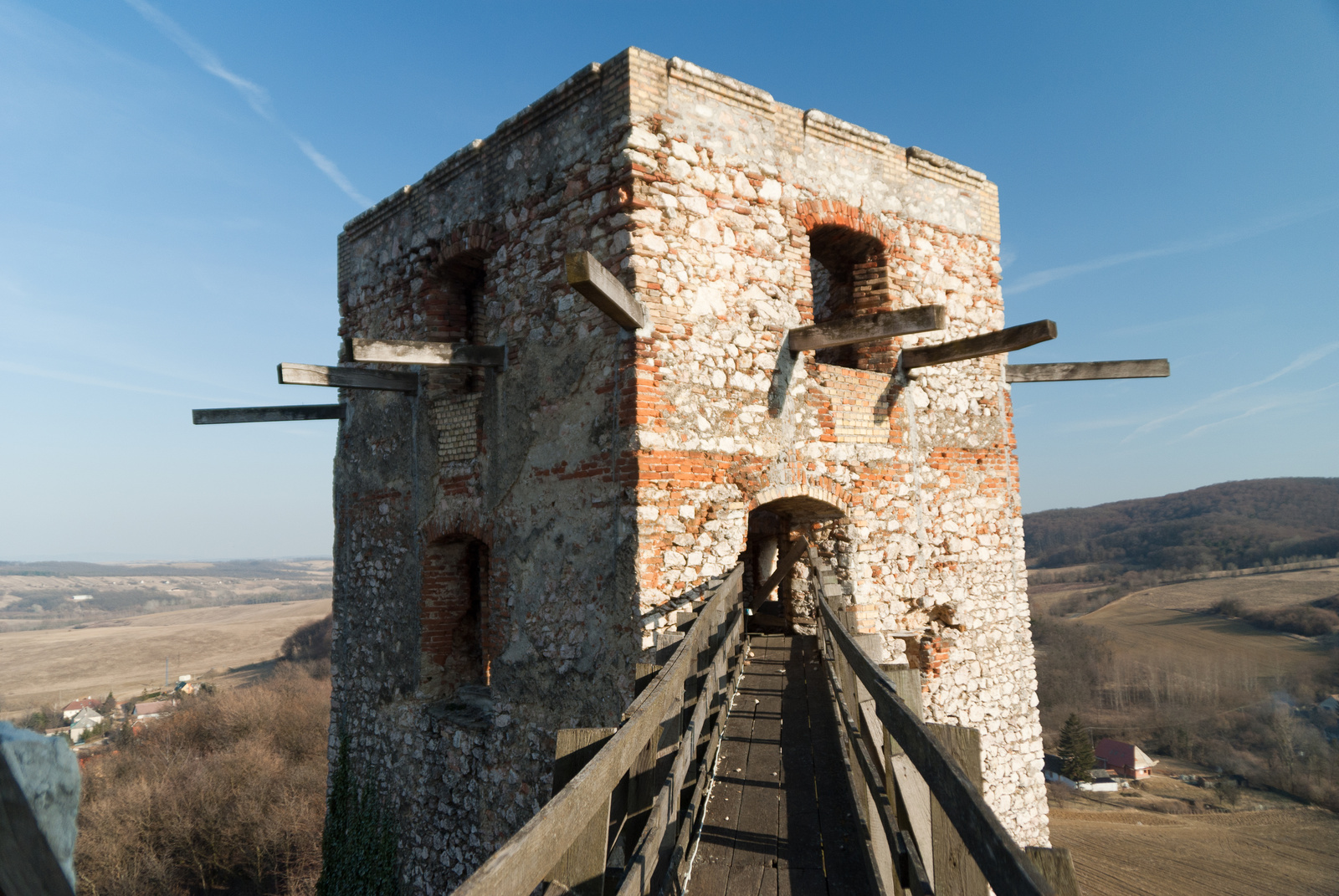

- Flag Coat of arms

- Location of Csesznek in Hungary
- Coordinates: 47.3554°N 17.8815°E
- Country: Hungary
- Region: Central Transdanubia
- County: Veszprém

Area
  - Total: 24.21 km^{2} (9.35 sq mi)

Population (2014)
  - Total: 564
  - Density: 23.3/km^{2} (60.3/sq mi)
- Time zone: UTC+1 (CET)
  - Summer (DST): UTC+2 (CEST)
- Postal code: 8419
- Area code: +36 88
- Website: http://csesznek.hu/

Csesznek (Hungarian pronunciation: [ˈt͡ʃɛsnɛk]; German: Zeßnegg, Croatian: Česneg, Slovak: Česnek) is a village in Zirc District, Veszprém county, Hungary. The village is known for its medieval castle.

== Etymology ==
The name comes from Slavic čestnik – a privileged person, an office bearer, nowadays also an elder family member at the wedding.

== History ==
The medieval castle of Csesznek was built around 1263 by the Jakab Cseszneky who was the swordbearer of the King Béla IV. He and his descendants have been named after the castle Cseszneky.

Between 1326 and 1392 it was a royal castle, when King Sigismund offered it to the House of Garai in lieu of the Banate of Macsó.

In 1482 the male line of the Garai family died out, and King Matthias Corvinus donated the castle to the Szapolyai family. In 1527, Baron Bálint Török became its owner.

During the 16th century the Csábi, Szelestey and Wathay families were in possession of Csesznek. In 1561, Lőrinc Wathay repulsed successfully the siege of the Ottomans. However, in 1594 the castle was occupied by Turkish troops, but in 1598 the Hungarians recaptured it.

In 1635, Dániel Esterházy bought the castle and village and from that time on Csesznek was the property of the Esterházy family until 1945.

== People ==
- Cseszneky family
  - Jakab Cseszneky
- Stephen II Csák
- Lőrinc Wathay
- Bálint Török
- Sándor Simonyi-Semadam
