= István Illésházy =

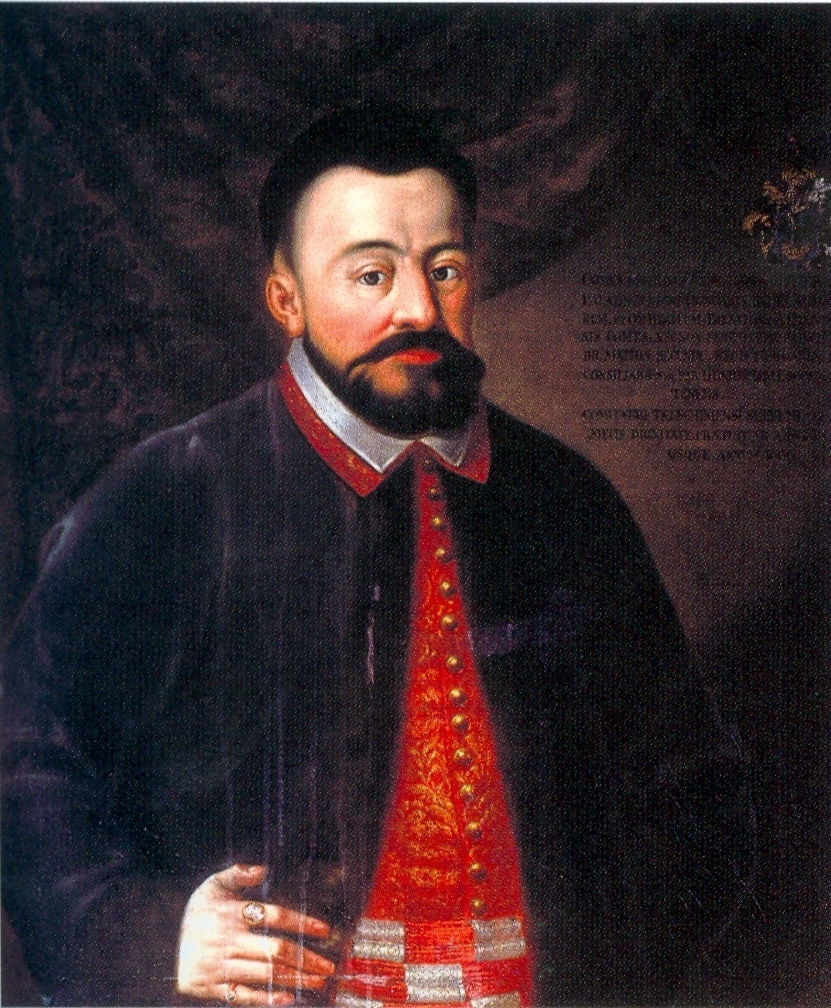
- Born: March 1541
- Died: 5 May 1609 (aged 68); Vienna

Count of Illésháza (formerly Baron) István Illésházy (March 1541 - Vienna, May 5, 1609) was a Protestant nobleman, chieftain, palatine of Hungary between 1608 and 1609.

== Life ==
The Illésházy family of the noble houses of Illésházy. His father's illeshazai Tamás Illésházy, the deputy lord of Pozsony county, his mother, the noble Zsófia Földes. His father's first wife was a descendant of the ancient prestigious Cséb Pogány family, Anna Csogány Pogány. He was born the fifth child in the family. He studied in Pozsony Then he became the correspondent clerk of the judge and warlord Miklós Pálffy, with whom he also served as a soldier. In 1572 he married second wife, the widow of István Derzsi Szerdahelyi, Anna, the daughter of Péter Erdődy, a Croatian ban. From 1573 he was deputy lord of Pozsony County. In 1577 he was appointed councilor of the Hungarian Royal Chamber. After the death of his second wife, in 1580 he married Kata Pálffy, the widow of the rich János Krusith. From 1584 he first became a royal councilor and then a court master, in 1582 he was appointed chief lord of the county of Liptov and acquired the castle of Lika. When Ilona Krusith, the daughter of Krusith, died in 1586, Count Kata Pálffy (who had previously been the wife of János Krusith), was inherited her estates. Illésházy acquired 6 stone castles (St. George, Bazin, Csábrág, Zsitnya, Mosfelt in Istria and Likavár), 3 dozen huge estates, seven thousand barrels of expensive wine, eight hundred horses, 5-6 thousand cattle and other movables. In 1587 he received the rank of first baron, then in 1593 from the king. From 1594 he was the chief lord of Trencsén County, and in 1600 he also acquired the Trencsény city estate for his family.

In 1603 he was accused of high treason writings against the king, and the royal personal represent János Joó (and Miklós Istvánffy) did everything he could to convict him of insult. They let him flee to Poland, but his property, the estates of Csábrág and Vittnya, were confiscated. Illésházy, who had suffered much in times of need, erupted, "The Lord God would have given me that I would not have understood this time, and I would have long since passed away from this disgusting world! Blessed are those who have died in the Lord and have not seen them." He later returned home and joined the Bocskai uprising and also played a major role in concluding the Peace of Vienna (1606). After this peace, he regained his previously confiscated estates, and from November 20, 1608, until his death, he was Hungary's first Protestant palatine. He saved Érsekújvár from the Turks, and he was the main facilitator of Matthias II's accession to the throne. He cleared himself of the false accusation against him and got compensation. In 1608 he was already present at the coronation parliament as royal chief court. In the same place he was elected palatine and at the same time appointed heiress chief of the counties of Liptov and Trenčín counties. The inherited headquarters of the two counties remained with the Illésházy family until its extinction.

== Sources ==
- Andor László 2017: Illésházy István csatlakozása Bocskaihoz (1605). Történelmi Szemle 2017/3. Illyésházy.
- Károlyi, Árpád: Illésházy István hűtlenségi pere[Trial about Treacherous blaming of Istvan Illésházy] 1883, Budapest, 218 p
- Péter Katalin 2008: Illésházy Istvánról
- Vende Aladár: Bazin. in: Borovszky Samu: Magyarország vármegyéi és városai. Pozsony vármegye. Digitális kiadás: Arcanum Adatbázis Kft. 2004.
- Pálffy Géza 2009: Pozsony megyéből a Magyar Királyság élére. Karrierlehetőségek a magyar arisztokráciában a 16–17. század fordulóján (Az Esterházy, a Pálffy és az Illésházy család felemelkedése). In: Századok, 143. (2009) 4. sz. p. 853–882.
